The Bible-Presbyterian Church ("BPC") was a conservative reformed denomination in Singapore. It existed from 1955 to 1988, following the history of the country, as the Bible-Presbyterian Church of Malaya, then the Bible-Presbyterian Church of Singapore and Malaysia, and finally the Bible Presbyterian Church of Singapore ("BPCOS") (with the then eight Malaysian BP churches in 1985 to register themselves in Malaysia thereafter) before the BPCOS dissolved in 1988. Since that time, Bible-Presbyterian ("B-P" or "BP") churches in Singapore have continued to exist separately. The B-P movement grew out of the Bible Presbyterian Church in the United States. , there were 20,000 members in 32 B–P churches in Singapore. The number of B-P churches in Singapore has grown to forty-three as of 2020/21.

BPC was noted for a belief in literal six-day creation and a preference for the King James Version ("KJV").

History 
The BPC was founded in 1955 by Timothy Tow. Tow had been influenced first by John Sung, and later by Carl McIntire. He was strongly opposed to liberal theology and ecumenism, and the de facto link of the English service he founded in 1950 in a Chinese Presbyterian church in the Chinese Presbyterian Synod that was connected to the World Council of Churches ("WCC") in promoting modernist ecumenism in opposition to the International Council of Christian Churches ("ICCC").  A conflict ensued and the English Service pastored by Tow in Life Church (生命堂) or Say Mia Tng (Teochew dialect) at Prinsep Street (not to be confused with Prinsep Street Presbyterian Church) severed connections with the Synod in 1955 to form Life Bible-Presbyterian Church ("Life B–P Church," "Life BP Church" or "Life BPC").

In 1988, after experiencing a period of significant dissension, the Synod of the BPC voted to dissolve itself. It was "mainly due to strong differences in interpreting the Doctrine of Biblical Separation, Fundamentalism, and Neo-Evangelicalism"—as in the statement issued by the BPC on 30 October 1988 describing the dissolution.

Divisions

Fundamentalist and Evangelical 
While individual BP churches operate separately and independently post BP Synod dissolution, they fall essentially or broadly into two factions or groups. One group subscribes to the fundamentalist stance of the founders while the other considers itself to be evangelical. This latter group of churches is denounced by the former to be "neo-evangelical" or "liberal", and are often called "the new B-Ps" because of a different interpretation on the doctrine of "Biblical Separation".

The evangelical group of B-P churches embraces the fellowship of any church that professes evangelical Protestant Christianity and cooperates with para-church organizations like Campus Crusade, Youth for Christ, Navigators and the Bible Study Fellowship. Many ministers or aspiring ministers in the evangelical group prefer an evangelical seminary (such as Fuller Theological Seminary, Temple Baptist Seminary, Singapore Bible College, Trinity Theological College or University of Nottingham) over the B-P's own seminary, Far Eastern Bible College ("FEBC"), which is fundamentalist.

Shortly after the dissolution of the BPC Synod on 31 October 1988, Quek Swee Hwa ("SH Quek") and David Wong invited the general public to a "Presentation Evening" on 19 November 1988 at the Sanctuary of the Clementi Bible Centre that led to them starting in 1989 the Biblical School of Theology, which later changed its name to Biblical Graduate School of Theology ("BGST").  Although the founders are BP ministers, BGST is a trans-denominational college.  Notwithstanding the statements on separation in its Theological Position, BGST is a non-separatist school.  It works and co-operates with persons in churches linked with the WCC.

After Life BPC failed in its lawsuit to dislodge the FEBC directors from the Gilstead Road premises to take over the operations of the FEBC due to the church disagreeing with the college teaching the doctrine of verbal plenary preservation ("VPP"),  Life BPC – taking the lead role – started Emmanuel Reformed Bible College ("ERBC") in January 2017 on the premises of Calvary (Jurong) BPC, an ERBC affiliate together with Maranatha BPC and Sharon BPC.

Twenty-three years after the dissolution of the BPCOS, four BP churches – Emmanuel, Herald, Zion Serangoon and Zion Bishan – inaugurated on 8 October 2011 the Bible-Presbyterian Church in Singapore ("BPCIS") to form what they had considered to be the new BP Presbytery.  However, the BPCIS was not legally constituted and registered as a society until 19 December 2018.  Three more BP churches – Mount Carmel, Mount Hermon and Shalom – joined after 2011 to make seven charter members before BPCIS submitted its application in 2017 to register as a society.  The BPCIS had only seven BP churches (out of a total of forty-three BP churches in Singapore) as charter members at its registration despite organising many meetings and activities prior to the registration's approval and gazetting by the government. However, David Wong, the first General Secretary of the BPCIS, announced in August 2020 on Mount Horeb BPC (another in the Mount Carmel group of mountain-named BP  churches) becoming the eighth member of the BPCIS. Wong announced in October 2021 on Grace BPC becoming the ninth BPCIS member. He announced in May 2022 on Hebron BPC joining on 10 March 2022 as the tenth member of BPCIS.  Mount Gerizim BPC, another mountain church operating on the premises of Hebron BPC at 10 Choa Chu Kang Street 52, Singapore 689284, is listed on the updated BPCIS website as the eleventh member.  

With only seven BP churches out of a total of 43 BP churches when BPCIS was registered with the ROS in December 2018 – it is now eleven (see above) – Jeffrey Khoo remarked that BPCIS calling itself the new BP Presbytery is a misnomer.

Leadership of Fundamentalist Faction 

The fundamentalist group was headed by Timothy Tow (d 20 April 2009) and his brother Tow Siang Hwa ("SH Tow").

Timothy Tow pastored Life BPC until 2003 when he left to found True Life BPC because his two assistant pastors, Charles Seet and Colin Wong, and (a majority of) the Session at Life BPC rejected a 100% perfect Bible without any mistake in the doctrine of the Verbal Plenary Preservation ("VPP") of Scripture. SH Tow headed the Calvary BP churches until his demise on 8 March 2019. However, Calvary BPC (Jurong), one of the churches, split with him (before his demise) when they issued on 6 November 2005 their statement "Explanation of Our Non-VPP Stand."

The fundamentalist group continues after the deaths of Timothy Tow and SH Tow with such new leaders as Jeffrey Khoo, Quek Suan Yew and Prabhudas Koshy – all directors and faculty members of the FEBC. All three new leaders uphold the VPP doctrine. They were among the defendants in the lawsuit between Life BPC and FEBC in which the church sued to evict the college from their Gilstead Road premises on account of the FEBC upholding the VPP doctrine. However, the church failed as the Court of Appeal, the apex court in Singapore's legal system, held that the VPP doctrine is not a deviation from the principles contained in the Westminster Confession of Faith ("WCF"), by which the work of the college has been informed and guided from its inception, and it is not inconsistent for a Christian who believes fully in the principles contained within the WCF and the VPI (Verbal Plenary Inspiration) doctrine to also subscribe to the VPP doctrine.

Leadership of Evangelical Faction 

The evangelical/new evangelical group is led mainly by SH Quek and David Wong; they headed the Zion-Carmel combination and played a significant role in the dissolution of the BP Synod or the BPCOS in 1988 because of their different views on Bible versions, tongues-speaking, and biblical separation.  SH Quek is currently the Senior Pastor of Emmanuel BPC and Pastor Emeritus of Zion Bishan BPC. David Wong is currently the Advisory Pastor of Zion Bishan BPC.

SH Quek and David Wong were, respectively, the pastors of Zion BPC (now Zion Serangoon BPC) and Mount Carmel BPC in 1988 when the BP Synod or the BPCOS dissolved. The BP churches included in the Zion group (of the Zion-Carmel combination) were Zion BPC, Bethany BPC (which dropped the BP name and renamed itself as Bethany Independent Presbyterian Church on 10 July 1992), Emmanuel BPC and Cana BPC; and the churches in the Carmel group (before the BP Synod dissolution) were Mount Carmel BPC, Hebron BPC and Mount Hermon BPC.

David Wong, SH Quek's protege, issued his response on the BP Synod dissolution in the "Carmel Weekly" of 6 November 1988 to the congregations he pastored and supervised in the Carmel group.  David Wong is also one of the four authors/editors in the 2018 publication, Heritage & Legacy of the Bible-Presbyterian Church in Singapore (hereinafter Heritage & Legacy); he wrote seven articles compared to six written by SH Quek in the book.  Although Chua Choon Lan ("CL Chua") wrote more articles in Heritage & Legacy, he did so as General Editor in a lay capacity; this is evidenced by the less doctrinal nature of his articles (seven of which are on church buildings) and his profession as a surgeon.  SH Quek and David Wong underline their role as the main spiritual leaders of the evangelical/new evangelical faction with answering the questions posed by the Editors in the round-table discussion in Heritage & Legacy on the dissolution of the BP Synod.

Quek Kiok Chiang ("KC Quek"), a founding BPC elder who relinquished the pastorship of Zion Serangoon to his son SH Quek on 31 October 1970, was on different side with Timothy Tow and SH Tow after the dissolution of the BPC in 1988. He (KC Quek) had defended his son's association and co-operation with para-church organizations; he also challenged the late Patrick Tan's proposal to him (as the incumbent Moderator before the Synod dissolution) to have Timothy Tow made the Synod Moderator to lead the BP Church back to the original stand before Patrick's proposal was withdrawn. Despite KC Quek's seniority, his switch to focus on pastoring the Mandarin/Teochew-speaking Faith BPC meant that the main leaders of the evangelical/new evangelical faction were (and are) SH Quek and David Wong. They also played key roles in the formation of BPCIS with eight of the current eleven BPCIS member churches hailing from the Zion-Carmel group (i.e., Zion Bishan, Zion Serangoon, Emmanuel, Mount Carmel, Mount Hermon, Mount Horeb, Hebron and Mount Gerizim ) – see "Fundamentalist and Evangelical" above.

Doctrine, Distinctives and Differences

Doctrinal Statement 

A typical BP church registered in 1986 has an article (usually Article 4) in its constitution stating that the church's doctrine shall follow that  system commonly known as "the Reformed Faith" as expressed in the Westminster Confession of Faith ("WCF"), the Larger and Shorter Catechisms. In addition to the Apostles' Creed, the chief tenets of the church's doctrine are set forth in 12 statements on: (i) the Scriptures; (ii) the Triune God; (iii) the virgin birth of Christ; (iv) the creation and fall of man; (v) the propitiatory and expiatory death of Christ; (vi) the bodily resurrection, ascension and exaltation of Christ; (vii) the personal, visible and pre-millennial return of Christ; (viii) salvation being by grace through faith; (ix) the ministry of the Holy Spirit; (x) the Sacraments of Baptism and Lord's Supper instituted by Christ; (xi) the eternal destiny of the saved and the lost; and (xii) the principle and practice of separation. (The numbers (i)-(xii) used below refer to the doctrinal matters in the corresponding numbers above.)

Churches in the Carmel group in the evangelical faction, however, do not follow the Doctrine template of a typical BP church. Most of them registered with the ROS after 1986 while Mount Carmel BPC registered earlier in 1982 with the Registry of Companies as Mount Carmel BP Church Ltd under the Companies Act (Cap. 50). As evident in their Statements of Faith/Beliefs posted on their websites, the Carmel group of churches omit certain statements in their Statements so that, unlike a typical BPC, they have a total of ten or eleven statements: Mount Hermon BPC omits statement (vii) on the personal, visible and premillennial return of Christ while Hebron BPC omits "premillennial" in  statement (vii).  Also the last statement (either the tenth or eleventh) of the Carmel group of churches omits the underlined words in  statement (xii) (i.e., 4.2.12  of Life BPC's or Shalom BPC's constitution): "We believe in the real, spiritual unity in Christ of all redeemed by His precious blood and the necessity of faithfully maintaining the purity of the Church in doctrine and life according to the Word of God and the principle and practice of biblical separation from the apostasy of the day being spearheaded by the Ecumenical Movement (2 Cor 6:14–18, Rev 18:4)". The omitted words reflect the link at the outset of the Singapore BPC with the ICCC in the battle against ecumenism and the WCC (represented locally by Malayan Christian Council ("MCC")).

Certain BP churches in the fundamentalist faction registered with the ROS after 1986, such as True Life BPC (2004) and Blessed Hope BPC (2014), expanded statement (i) on the Scriptures into three sub-statements to cover the VPI (Autographs) and the VPP (Apographs) of Scriptures in the original languages, the infallibility and inerrancy of the Hebrew OT and the Greek NT underlying the KJV, and the upholding of the KJV as the English translated Word of God for church use (WCF I:VIII); these churches also introduced an additional statement on God creating the whole universe ex nihilo (out of nothing) by the Word of His mouth in six literal or natural days (WCF IV:I).

Premillennialism 

Premillennialism has been an important distinctive of the BPC in both America and Singapore from the very beginning. Timothy Tow learnt this doctrine from Dora Yu, John Sung, Chia Yu Ming, Oliver Buswell, Allan MacRae and R. Laird Harris, the last three-named being Tow's professors at Faith Theological Seminary which was founded by conservative Presbyterians headed by Carl McIntire who himself held dearly to the doctrine of the Premillennial Return of Christ and had it incorporated into the WCF by the Bible Presbyterian Church of America, founded also by him and other conservative Presbyterian clergymen. Upon Tow's return to Singapore after graduating from Faith, he imparted this doctrine to the congregants he pastored from 1950 and to the students he taught at FEBC where he was its lecturer and principal from 1962 (until his demise).

Premillennialism holds that (a) there will be a long period (1,000 years) of universal peace and happiness upon earth and (b) the return of Christ will happen before this period, rather than after this period – which is postmillennialism – while amillennialism (meaning "no millennium") denies that there will be such a period, with the 1,000 years of Revelation 20 being not literal but symbolic of Christ's present reign from heaven through the Church.  The doctrine of premillennialism is so clearly taught in the Bible that it is difficult for anyone, absent resorting to "spiritualizing" hermeneutic, to explain away the facts in (a) and (b) above without calling also into question the explainer's interpretation of other Biblical doctrines.

Reformed Theology and BPC's Dispensational Premillennialism 
Of the two types of premillennialism, historic and dispensational, the Singapore BPC adopts the latter – which is the position of McIntire, MacRae and Buswell who are all Reformed and covenantal in their system of theology.

Reformed theology uses the literal (i.e., grammatical-historical-canonical) method of interpretation and sees Israel as Israel without replacing it with the Church. In historic premillennialism, the rapture – an event described in 1 Thessalonians 4:15-17 as Christ's coming in the air for His people (the first phase of His second coming) – and the return of Christ to earth to reign as king (the second phase of His second coming) occur at the same time, with the rapture happening at the end of the tribulation (post-tribulation rapture) so that Christians must go through the 7-year tribulation to endure suffering and persecution for the cause of Christ; in dispensational premillennialism, the two events are separated by either 7 years (pre-tribulation rapture) or 3½ years (mid-tribulation rapture). Historic premillennialists, like amillennialists and postmillennialists, believe that Israel has been replaced by the Church, and that prophecies relating to Israel must be interpreted as relating to the Church; dispensational premillennialists, also known as pro-Israel premillennialists,  on the other hand adopts a literal approach to interpretation and emphasize the importance of the nation of Israel in the study of the end times and in God restoring His chosen nation to greatness when Messiah returns.

Romans 11 key to understanding Israel and the Church 
Timothy Tow, writing on Romans 11 as being the key to answering the question on whether the blessings promised to Israel are fulfilled in the Church or in Israel herself, says that Israel will be restored when Christ returns to earth to establish His peaceful reign of a thousand years sitting on the throne of His father David – a position in accord with that of John Walvoord in interpreting Romans 11. Allan MacRae, in Biblical Christianity published with SH Quek helping him select his letters to be included in the book, says Scripture teaches that the Jews will return in unbelief to the land God covenanted to them through Abraham, and that the nation Israel living in the land in the day of Christ's coming will be converted (Zechariah 12:10; Ezekiel 20:33-40; 3:21-25) as God has declared that Abraham's seed will not cease from being a nation before Him forever (Jeremiah 31:35-37) and, while He is not going to leave Israel unpunished (Jeremiah 30:7-11), His purposes in grace will be fulfilled when His purposes in judgment are accomplished (Jeremiah 23:5-8; Hosea 2:14-16; Romans 11:26, 27).

BPC's Covenant Theology as opposed to Dipensationalism 
Though dispensational premillennial in their eschatology, the BPC and its ministers are covenantal – and not dispensational – in their theology (soteriology) as not all dispensational premillennialists are dispensationalists even though every dispensationalist is dispensational premillennial in his eschatology.

While dispensationalism sees God's redemptive plan and history in a number of different tests and consequent failures in a system of discontinuity (C. I. Scofield lists seven dispensations),  there is continuity in covenant theology which sees all of God's dealings with man under one of two covenants: (a) the Covenant of Works in which man was under, before the fall, wherein God promised him (through Adam, the federal head of the race) eternal blessedness if he perfectly kept the law; and (b) the Covenant of Grace (Romans 5:12-21) wherein God, of His free grace, promises the same blessings to all, since the fall, who believe in Christ (the federal head of the church).

The continuity in covenant theology sees a unifying theme of one Saviour and one way of salvation in the Covenant of Grace as OT believers had looked forward in faith to the (first) coming of Christ the Messiah-Saviour to atone for their sins by His sacrifice on the cross of Calvary, while NT believers looked or look back in faith to Him since He had already come and made the atoning sacrifice:  the church is manifested in the nation of Israel  in the OT (as Israel is not merely a political/national entity) and continues in the NT 'as organised from the day of Pentecost onward'.

Only a remnant of the Jews, including the Apostle Paul, are in the NT church (Romans 11:1-5) since Israel as a whole, except for the remnant, is blinded and cut off from the Abrahamic promises of grace (after their rejection of Christ), but they will be grafted in again into the Abrahamic tree after "the fullness of the Gentiles" has come in (Romans 11:25) even as Gentile Christians have their position in grace grafted into the Abrahamic tree.  The NT church will be raptured prior to the salvation of Israel which will as a whole turn to the Lord after the rapture, as Paul predicts in Romans 11:26. (See also Timothy Tow in The Story of My Bible-Presbyterian Faith and Allan MacRae in Biblical Christianity above).

Premillennialism and Bible-Presbyterianism 
The White Paper of the BPCIS says Premillennialism is non-essential to Bible-Presbyterianism even though BPCIS will only teach this view in their churches (p. 512 Heritage & Legacy).  The doctrinal statements of certain BPCIS churches (see "Doctrinal Statement" above) allow their ministers and members to embrace Amillennialism or Postmilliennialism. In a revamp of its website recently, Zion Serangoon BPC changed its statement on the second coming of Christ to: "We believe in the personal, visible, glorious, and bodily return of our Lord Jesus Christ …".  Zion Bishan BPC, which operated with the same constitution and statement of faith as the Serangoon parent or head office until Bishan's registration as its own entity with the ROS in 2010, still has: "We believe in the personal, visible and premillennial return of our Lord and Saviour Jesus Christ …" (underlining added to show the word removed by Zion Serangoon BPC).

Contrary to BPCIS's assertion, Joshua Yong clarifies that the BPC does not separate from other Christians or churches just because they hold to a different millennial view; Peter Masters of Metropolitan Tabernacle, who is amillennial, was invited to speak to the BPC.  The BPC only requires its members to adhere to its constitution which, inter alia, has a doctrinal statement declaring premillennialism as an essential doctrine or a chief tenet among a list of key beliefs or doctrines that they must subscribe to when they are admitted as members, and they are free to leave and join another church if they should (later) disagree.

Biblical Separation 
That the BPC was a separatist church is beyond doubt as the late Bobby Sng, renowned non-BP church historian, in his book In His Good Time: The Story of the Church in Singapore 1819–2002 (3rd Ed, Singapore Bible Society, p. 232) described the BPC, after its separation from the MCC, as a church which developed at a rapid pace 'in isolation from other churches' and its strong call to all Protestant Christians to separate themselves from churches with liberal leadership appealed to some but antagonized the leaders of the larger churches.

The editors of Heritage & Legacy of the Bible-Presbyterian Church in Singapore, representing BPCIS, attempt to rewrite the history of the BP Church.  On the doctrine, principle and practice of Biblical separation, they attempt to do so in several ways.

No separation at the outset? 

CL Chua in Heritage & Legacy questioned whether there was actually a split or a break away from the mother church Say Mia Tng since Life BPC continued to use the premises of Say Mia Tng for nearly eight years before moving out on 21 October 1962 to Life BPC's present premises at Gilstead Road.  Chua also pointed to Timothy Tow not accusing the Chinese Presbyterian churches of being liberal or ecumenical, and Life BPC and Say Mia Tng maintaining a friendly relationship during their co-existence on the same premises.  He wondered if, instead of a break, Life BPC was just going 'independent' with the blessings of its mother church.

Ko Ling-Kang pointed to Heritage & Legacy obtaining the testimonies of some pioneer members of the BP Church in Chapter Four – Voice of the Silent Generation to attempt to make their point that there was no split or separation. With seemingly leading questions posed to elicit the desired answers, Ko remarked that Elder Joshua Lim Heong Wee responded that there was no break from Say Mia Tng and there was also no issue with its pastors and elders over their theological beliefs. However, Ko remarked that the testimony of Elder Dr Ang Beng Chong is more factual and truthful. After noting that theological liberalism was spreading worldwide and had also reached Singapore, Ang went on to say that Say Mia Tng's English Service, under the leadership of Timothy Tow, separated from the MCC to align itself with the ICCC and 'Bible-Presbyterian (BP)' was added to the church's name to distinguish it from the mainline Presbyterian Synod of Singapore.

Ang's account agrees with that of Timothy Tow who, in The Singapore B–P Church Story, wrote that the BP Church founded by him was to uphold the torch of the separatist stand and of the 20th Century Reformation Movement. Tow also wrote in January 1955, after the last battle for the Faith was unsuccessfully fought in Muar at the Trinity Presbyterian Church against the 'usual phalanx of modernist missionaries and subservient national pastors', that the Interim Committee decided to fully constitute Say Mia Tng (English service) as a church and to sever connections with the Synod on account of modernism.

KC Quek, BPC founding elder, in The Bible-Presbyterian Church of Singapore and Malaysia 1950–1971 concurred when he wrote that the second fold of the threefold cord of the BP Church Movement was the determination from the beginning "to separate from all entanglements" by taking the Scriptural position of separation (2 Cor. 6:14–18) in joining the ICCC to 'contend earnestly for the faith once delivered unto the saints' (Jude 3) and cutting link, even indirectly, with the apostate Ecumenical Movement.

Ko Ling-Kang remarked that if it was just the planting of a daughter church which went independent with the mother church's blessing, there would not be a need for Life BPC to sever ties with the Synod.  While Life BPC continued to operate on the premises of Say Mia Tng after the break and maintained a friendly relationship with mother church, there was no longer any formal ecclesiastical relationship. If mother church was in agreement with Life BP Church, mother church would not stay on in the ecumenical Synod but heed Life BPC's call to all Protestant Christians, as noted by church historian Bobby Sng (see above), to separate themselves from churches that had liberal leadership.

That there was indeed a separation at the onset of the BPC is clear as Dev Menon, Pastor of Zion Bishan BP Church, acknowledges at p. 150 Heritage & Legacy that 'the BP Church will be remembered as a church born and bred on its stand of separation'.  The editors of Heritage & Legacy seem to want to sow doubt about the separation because acknowledging it means that the BPC at its inception practised separation not only from liberalism, but also separation from believers who had compromised with ecumenical groups – what the BPCIS term secondary separation.

Issue of secondary separation 
If there was a separation of the BPC at the onset, as indeed there was (see above), Daniel Chua – who succeeded David Wong as Senior Pastor of Mount Carmel BPC in December 1993 before becoming its Pastor-at-Large in January 2016, postulates that the initial separation stand of the BP Church was moderate with only 'primary' or first-degree separation – allegedly the stance adopted by McIntire in the earlier years of the BPC of America which was then passed to the Singapore BPC – but this was changed or modified over time by McIntire and by a 'strong-headed but influential minority' in the Singapore BPC to incorporate 'secondary' or second-degree separation. If Daniel Chua fails to prove that the separation stand was not a moderate one at the BPC inception, he then asserts that it should have been one – like what the BPCIS are doing which, they claim, Machen would approve it if he were alive today and which is also the teaching of the Bible, based on Daniel's exegesis of certain Bible verses.

That the BPC of America adopted at the beginning a strong or militant stance on separation – "one that calls for separation not just from unbelief and apostasy, but also from compromise and disobedient brethren" – is clear. Ko Ling-Kang points to McGoldrick, et al. (2012) describing as 'rigorous' the posture of the BPC on personal and ecclesiastical separation, and BP minister Francis A Schaeffer in a paper to the BP Synod in 1942 presented the BPC as 'militantly' stating its system of doctrine as separatists.

The Articles of Association drawn up at the inaugural meeting of the BPC of America in June 1937 shows the founding fathers (including McIntire) had intended to associate as militant fundamentalists in their fight against "modernism, compromise, indifferentism, and worldliness", and this militant separation stand was then passed as a heritage to the Singapore BPC as Timothy Tow studied at Faith Seminary in the 1940s (January 1948 to May 1950) when, one wintry morning in mid-January 1948, his heart was 'strangely warmed' by McIntire's message at the seminary's Chapel Hour challenging young men to join a Twentieth Century Reformation which Tow later did upon his return to Singapore in joining the Separatist Cause of the ICCC. Tow affirmed the BPC's militant stand when he quoted  McIntire's declaration, "The Bible Presbyterian Church is a militant church in the defense of the faith", in his book The Singapore B–P Church Story for the Singapore BPC that he founded.

Ko Ling-Kang, on p. 7 of his article in The Burning Bush (January 2021), points to the BPCIS citing McIntire's words for use against him in their claim that he initially urged caution against 'extreme separation' and 'took a very moderate approach in the earlier years' on separation before hardening his stance in the 1950s.  The words are probably those printed on p. 507 of Daniel Chua's article in Heritage & Legacy on McIntire's address to the ministers and elders of the BPC on 7 September 1944 calling them not to separate from the 'many godly people still in apostate denominations' further than what is required in God's Word. But Chua omits those words which clarify the context of McIntire's call being one that was made to the BPC ministers and elders to stay (separated) while trying to reach godly Christians in the apostate denominations to urge them to come out of their denominations and join the reformation – rather than to call the BPC elders and ministers to embark on an offensive to infiltrate the apostate denominations.

In the fundamentalists-versus-liberals battle for Princeton Seminary, Machen showed that he would not tolerate the inconsistences of a moderate position by ranking three possible attitudes that one could adopt in the conflict: (a) standing for Christ, which is the best; (b) standing for anti-Christian Modernism, which is the next best; and (c) being neutral, which is the worst.  McIntire follows Machen's separatist principle in that either unbelievers must be pushed out or Bible-believers must withdraw; else the church stops being the church. Ko Ling-Kang, accordingly, points to Machen and McIntire withdrawing from the Presbyterian Church in the U.S.A. ("PCUSA") and Princeton Seminary to found the Presbyterian Church of America (renamed Orthodox Presbyterian Church) and Westminster Seminary, not because these two institutions were full of apostasy and liberal teachings but because the moderates in their leadership and the General Assembly of the PCUSA did not take firm action against the liberals but sought to mediate a neutral position to accommodate all views.

The Singapore BPC from its inception practised separation from Christians and churches which refused to separate from apostasy. While Daniel Chua refuses to acknowledge this, he is again contradicted by Dev Menon who writes that in the earlier years of the 1950s 'only the BP Church insisted on having secondary separation' (p. 146 Heritage & Legacy).

Jeffrey Khoo (True Life BPC) and Charles Seet (Life BPC) see no degrees in separation, as separation is simply separation and has the holiness of God – which has no degrees – as its premise. They share the same view as McIntire who sees separation as a command that requires only obedience and it should not be fractured into degrees (for options to obey or to ignore), as to do so is also disobedience and sin. But BPCIS sees separation in different degrees and asserts that the right biblical approach is only primary (first-degree) not secondary (second-degree) separation.

Citing the issue to be in the different interpretations of the same Scripture passages cited by both sides to support their views, Daniel Chua (p. 501 of Heritage & Legacy) attempts an exegesis of 2 Thessalonians 3:6-15.  He says that 'keep away' in v. 6 and 'not associate' in v. 14 (per modern Bible versions used by him) cannot mean to 'totally cut themselves off from a brother' because v. 15 to 'not regard him as an enemy, but warn him as a brother' means as he is, after all, a 'brother' (adelphos).

Ko Ling-Kang disagrees with Daniel Chua as he sees (a) Daniel applying eisegesis, i.e., interpreting a text by reading into it his [Daniel's] own assumptions or biases based on his own preconceived notion that the Bible cannot be calling a believer to completely dissociate from another believer simply because v. 15 says that we are to regard him as a brother and not as an enemy, but sometimes the best course in dealing with a disobedient brother lovingly is to separate from him so that he may be ashamed (v. 14) and repent of his ways; and (b) Daniel completely ignoring the two Greek words stellesthai (v. 6) translated as 'withdraw yourselves' and sunanamignumi (v. 14) translated as 'have no company', in the KJV, which are commands that must be obeyed as the same Greek word  in 1 Corinthians 5:9 ('not to company with' in KJV) and in 1 Corinthians 5:11 ('not to keep company' in KJV), used in applying church discipline to excommunicate a member who is a fornicator (1 Corinthians 5:5), means having no fellowship with that member believer, for to do so is to condone his sin.

Timothy Tow and Jeffrey Khoo in their book Theology for Every Christian say separation is a command and not an option.

Fundamentalism v New Evangelicalism 
In the early 1940s, after the dust of the fundamentalist-modernist controversies had settled, there arose a new generation of evangelicals and so-called fundamentalists who were repelled by the militant stance of their evangelical/fundamentalist forefathers in separating from those who denied many fundamental truths of the Bible such as its inspiration, inerrancy and infallibility, the deity and virgin birth of Christ, etc. In England, the term "fundamentalist" is less preferred to "evangelical", and it is also no exaggeration that many who call themselves evangelicals today are New Evangelicals as the two terms have become synonymous.

The term "Neo Evangelicalism" was coined by Harold Ockenga in 1948  emphasizing the repudiation of separatism and a determination to engage in theological dialogue in a new emphasis to apply the gospel to sociological, political and economic issues.
Ockenga was pastor of the Park Street Church in Boston, founder of the National Association of Evangelicals, co-founder and first president of Fuller Theological Seminary, first president of the World Evangelical Fellowship (now World Evangelical Alliance), one-time editor of Christianity Today and a member of the board of directors for the Billy Graham Evangelistic Association.

The Singapore BPC from its inception was linked to the ICCC – a worldwide fellowship of fundamental churches opposed to liberalism, ecumenism, neo-evangelicalism and charismatism.  Founding BPC elder KC Quek, prior to his switch to support his son KC Quek (see "Leadership of evangelical faction" above), affirmed in 1985 on the BPC, in concert with the ICCC, contending in Singapore against New Evangelicals Billy Graham (1978) and Luis Palau (1-7 June 1986).

Opposition to Billy Graham 
McIntire in the U.S. and Timothy Tow in Singapore opposed Billy Graham and his co-operative evangelism as they saw the danger in Graham's compromise.  McIntire said that Graham had become "a cover for the apostates". At Graham's 1957 New York crusade, he eulogized Dr. Jesse Baird, a well-known liberal and apostate, by calling him 'a great servant of Christ';  at his 1957 San Francisco Crusade, he praised Episcopal Bishop James Pike who denied the deity, virgin birth, miracles, and bodily resurrection of Jesus Christ; and at his 1963 Los Angeles Crusade, he commended Methodist Bishop Gerald Kennedy, the crusade's chairman who denied practically every fundamental doctrine of the Christian faith, as "one of the ten greatest Christian preachers in America". Other modernists or liberals lauded by Graham include Rudolph Bultmann, Karl Barth, Emil Brunner, Reinhold Niebuhr, Paul Tillich, Robert J. McCracken and Norman Vincent Peale.

The spirit of tolerance in neo-evangelicalism caused Graham to end up in universalism and liberalism as he believed that people can be saved without knowing Christ and he also expressed uncertainty about a literal fire in hell as a place of eternal torment. Despite deviating from the Christian faith, Graham maintained that he fully adhered to the fundamental tenets of the faith for himself and his ministry.

Timothy Tow's opposition to Billy Graham came into focus when he serialised J.A. Johnson's book Billy Graham – the Jehoshaphat of our Generation and published two news reports in his capacity as special correspondent for an Australian Christian newspaper New Life in the Far Eastern Beacon, November and December 1968 on the Graham-sponsored Asia-South Pacific Congress of Evangelism held in Singapore from November 5–13, 1968 (the "Congress"). Tow said he had the  support of Life BPC, except for one or two in the Session which later increased to a few, and also the BP Presbytery.

Daniel Chua paints a different picture (p. 518, Heritage & Legacy), based probably on pioneer member Joshua Lim's earlier account in Heritage & Legacy (pp. 185–186) that the Session was unhappy with Tow's work. But Tow differed from Lim in that while having to write fairly and accurately the two reports for New Life, Tow also put in a conclusion – unpalatable to some – in the second report by remarking that the line of separation from Ecumenical apostasy maintained by the 20th Century Reformation Movement in Singapore and Malaysia in the spirit of John Sung during the previous two decades had been all but obliterated by the Congress and warning that while thousands might be "signed up" into the Ecumenical fold, thousands might also be "signed off".

New Evangelicalism in Singapore BPC 
Among the detractors who opposed Timothy Tow on the Billy Graham issue in the late 1960s (above), Jeffrey Khoo says that some had repented.  One of them was SH Tow  who was on the same side as Joshua Lim (p. 186 Heritage & Legacy) but changed when he realised he had erred (p. 430 Heritage & Legacy). SH Tow spoke out against the 1978 Billy Graham Crusade ("BGC") in Singapore.

Joshua Lim, however, remained intransigent as he participated in the 1978 BGC by being a member of its Advisory Committee, albeit in a personal capacity and not as a BPC elder (p. 186 Heritage & Legacy).  Joshua Lim's and Daniel Chua's remarks on the lack of support for Timothy Tow's opposition to the Billy Graham-sponsored Congress in 1968 (see above) lack credibility, since  the BPC – to the seeming lament of David Wong – did not participate in the 1978 BGC which attracted participation from 237 out of 265 Protestant congregations in Singapore (p. 419 Heritage & Legacy). The claim of CL Chua (pp. 98–99 Heritage & Legacy) that ministers and Session members were regarded as 'dissenters' for disagreeing with Timothy Tow in the first decade of the BPC despite representing the majority view lacks documentary proof.

Jeffrey Khoo finds it disconcerting that the editors and the contributing writers of Heritage & Legacy call themselves "BP" and talk about the BP "heritage and legacy" but yet write approvingly of Graham while maligning Timothy Tow, the Singapore BPC founding father, who took a separatist stand against Graham. This is contrary to the claim on their website that their book was published inter alia to honour BP "pioneers".

The current President of the ICCC, Brad K Gsell, is also opposed to Billy Graham as he wrote The Legacy of Billy Graham: The accommodation of truth to error in the evangelical church (1998, Revised and Expanded Edition, published by Fundamental Presbyterian Publications). SH Quek, previously General Secretary of the ICCC and currently its Second Vice-President, seems to be tone-deaf or indifferent to Gsell and the ICCC's stance even though he [Quek] mentions serving many years in the ICCC and its agencies (pp. 80–81 Heritage & Legacy).

SH Quek's view on separation is not the same as that of his father KC Quek who, in the early years of the BPC, was regarded by Timothy Tow as "McIntire's ardent disciple" equal to Tow in zeal for the defence of the faith. KC Quek's separatist stand (after switching side to join SH Quek) seemed to have dimmed or changed as Dev Menon at p. 149 Heritage & Legacy mentions KC Quek's message at the Golden Jubilee of the SCCC in 2006, printed in the Far Eastern Beacon in 2010 as "My Thanksgiving Testimonies", recommending member SCCC churches going forward to continue to separate from the Ecumenical movement (were they not already separated?) but the subsequent words (in Menon's article) are unclear as to whether KC Quek was calling member SCCC churches to remain within the Ecumenical movement (and not separate?) to witness to (non-SCCC) churches or to remain indifferent.

The editors of Heritage & Legacy chose to include only KC Quek's reports on welfare services in Singapore (pp. 363–364) and Christian relief work to Kampuchea (pp. 377–378) in the book rather than his epochal message on the three-fold cord in 1971  (repeated in 1985) which characterises the BPC from its inception.  It is symptomatic of New Evangelicals to change focus to social work such as the provision of assistance in natural disasters.

Khoo feels that those who oppose the doctrine and practice of separation of the founding father should do the honourable thing by leaving the BPC to form their own denomination and not remain to give lip-service to separation when they are practically neo-evangelicals. SH Quek, who was ordained on 31 October 1970 to succeed his father as pastor of Zion BPC shortly after his return to Singapore on 7 October 1970 after studying a decade abroad (to obtain his BD from Faith Seminary and his PhD from the University of Manchester), has his article The Christian and Music and two reports on Zion BPC and Zion Kindergarten in The Bible-Presbyterian Church of Singapore and Malaysia 1950–1971 where, on p. 61, is printed the words in Ecumenism or New Revolution? of Thomas Molnar who detests the arrogance and cowardice of those who do not believe in or agree with the organization to which they belong, but remain to bore from within in order to change the institution into something different from what it is and has been, when they should be acting like honourable men to leave the organization for another which they approve or found a new organization and gain disciples by the importance and clarity of their own faith.

Timothy Tow in The Singapore B-P Church Story lauded a former B-P church stating  herself as "Independent" as being "bold enough" to drop her B-P name. That former B-P church, a daughter of Zion B-P Church, is now Bethany Independent-Presbyterian Church.(see "Leadership of Evangelical Faction" above).

Even J. Gresham Machen, whom they [the BPCIS] claim to look up to (see "Issue of secondary separation" above), detests the strategy New Evangelicals employ to infiltrate and change organisations from within; he gives an illustration that those who advocate Republican principles should not think of making a declaration of conformity to Democratic principles to gain entry into a Democratic club to finally turn its resources into an anti-Democratic propaganda, and a church should be more honest than a political club.

Daniel Chua denies that the "moderates" – by which they call themselves – are neo-evangelicals, but Jeffrey Khoo disagrees as after the dissolution of the Synod in 1988 they have departed further from the original BP position by advancing their non-separatist stand in cooperating with those who have compromised the faith, by being open to charismatic tongues, by replacing the KJV with modern corrupt Bible versions and by introducing Contemporary Christian Music ("CCM" ) into their worship services. Khoo also points to Bob Phee, now with BPCIS, who wrote and distributed in October 1988 a paper entitled "Neo-Evangelicalism in the Bible-Presbyterian Church" detailing the neo-evangelicalism of SH Quek.

Harold Ockenga, the father of New Evangelicalism, in his foreword to Harold Lindsell's Battle for the Bible wrote that Neo-evangelicalism is different from Fundamentalism in the former's repudiation of separatism, and New Evangelicalism adherents emphasized, inter alia, the recapture of denominational leadership and the reexamination of theological problems such as the antiquity of man, the universality of the flood and God's method of creation.

Jeffrey Khoo notes with no surprise that (a) SH Quek, David Wong, Daniel Chua et al. would want to recapture the BP denominational leadership in the formation of a new presbytery in the BPCIS (see "Leadership of Evangelical Faction" above); (b) SH Quek being open to the Genesis "years" being "months" and not literally "years" while questioning the universality of the Genesis Flood, God's method of creation, etc.; and (c) David Wong obtained his DMin degree from Fuller Seminary, flagship seminary of neo-evangelicalism, and had worked with Haggai Institute which co-operates with liberals, Catholics, and charismatics.

Khoo also points to neo-evangelicals speaking of separation and saying they are for it when they are actually not, invariably contradicting the Bible and themselves – an observation made also by David Cloud that not every New Evangelical is as frank as Ockenga in his repudiation of separatism as some merely give lip service to separation because they neither like nor practise it.  In a revamp of its website recently, Zion Serangoon BPC revised its statement of beliefs by reducing from 12 to 9  the statements which form the chief tenets of faith/beliefs of a typical BPC (see "Doctrinal Statement" above);  the last or twelfth statement on biblical separation has now been dropped.  Zion Bishan BPC, which operated with the same constitution and statement of beliefs as the Serangoon parent or head office until Bishan's registration as its own entity with the ROS in 2010, still has all 12 statements in its statement of faith including the twelfth or last statement on biblical separation: "We believe in … faithfully maintaining the purity of the Church in doctrine and life according to the Word of God and the principle and practice of biblical separation from the apostasy of the day being spearheaded by the Ecumenical Movement (or other such movements) (2 Cor 6:14-18; Rev 18:4)".

KJV and Modern English Bibles 
Another feature which once distinguished the BPC from other churches is its preference for the KJV of the English Bible and there was a period of time in which the BPC in Singapore used only the KJV in public reading, preaching and teaching.  Elder Chia Hong Chek, a pioneer member of the BPC, says that Timothy Tow wanted the English service he founded and pastored at Say Mia Tng – which became Life BPC – to be a distinct Bible-believing church and also to stick to the KJV, and not the RSV (p. 172, Heritage & Legacy).

Timothy Tow was persuaded at one time to use the New International Version ("NIV") as Laird Harris and Allan MacRae, his teachers at Faith Seminary, were among the NIV translators (p. 178, Heritage & Legacy). However, the use of the NIV was brief as Tow's unswerving support for the KJV did not abate since Life BPC continued to use it for public reading even though Tan Wai Choon, its assistant pastor 1978–1981, encouraged the NIV's use, albeit only for private reading with the NASB; the BP Synod finally issued a statement on 26 October 1981 affirming reliance on the KJV and recommending that the two newer versions may be used for collateral reading and reference, in particular by serious students of the Bible, but the AV or the KJV should not be displaced or replaced (pp. 178–179, Heritage & Legacy).

Timothy Tow did not follow Harris and MacRae all the way on the NIV as he wrote in 1998 the lyrics for The King James Bible vs Hundred Versions and penned in the Life BPC's weekly of 26 July 1998 (while he was pastor of the church) his call to those using the NIV, the RSV and other modern Bible versions "to cease taking their poison and be delivered from the death in their pot".  He also wrote the foreword to SH Tow's book Beyond Versions – A Biblical Perspective of Modern English Bibles (1998) which upholds the KJV against modern English Bibles.

Timothy Tow  praised McIntire's swift offensive against the RSV and although McIntire did not act as speedily when the NIV first appeared in 1978 due to fifth columnists within the ICCC ranks, Tow nonetheless commended him for reaching "the crowning of his life-long struggle against Satan's wiles to falsify God's Word" when the ICCC, at its birthplace in Amsterdam, in 1998 passed a resolution urging "all Bible-believing churches worldwide to use only the Authorized KING JAMES VERSION in their services and in their teaching ministry" amidst more than 150  so-called 'versions' of the Bible extant around the world.

McIntire's legacy on the KJV continues in the Bible Presbyterian Church in Collingswood, NJ – the church that he founded and pastored – where they still "believe the King James Version is the most faithful and accurate translation available in the English language" and they use it exclusively in public worship and in the teaching and training of their children and youth.

Although SH Quek has been associated with the ICCC for many years (pp. 80–81 Heritage & Legacy – see also New Evangelicalism in Singapore BPC above), the BPCIS sees Bible versions as a non-essential and their churches are free  to use the versions of their choice according to guidelines of the Presbytery (p. 512, Heritage & Legacy).  While the use of the KJV is not precluded, NIV and ESV are promoted and usually used.

When Ho Peng Kee was installed as an elder of Mount Carmel BPC on 17 April 1987, he was presented with an NIV (1984) bible by David Wong and Ang Beng Chong with the latter hand-writing on the inner cover of the presented NIV Bible the charge to Ho in the KJV in full in  beneath which Wong and Ang signed off their names. Zion Serangoon BPC has officially added the ESV as a Second Official Translation to the KJV for public reading in the church besides recommending the New King James Version ("NKJV") (1982), the NASB (1995), the NIV (1984) and The Holman Christian Standard Bible (2005) ("HCSB") to its members for collateral reading and study – based on a paper headed BP Distinctives on Bible Versions issued by the church's Session and Board of Deacons on 7 July 2015.  (See also first paragraph in this section above on the BPC being distinguished at its onset for exclusive use of the KJV.)

Although the NKJV is translated from the Majority Text (see “NIV, KJV and their texts” below for  “Majority Text” use in different situations), Life BPC in its Golden Jubilee Magazine 1950–2000 in A Doctrinal Positional Statement of Life B-P Church (a) flashed out the NKJV changing the KJV text in about 60,000 places, including perfectly good terms in the KJV that should have remained unchanged; (b) considered the NIV 'unreliable' and (c) called it the "New Evangelical Version" (NEV) because of the deep involvement of the National Association of Evangelicals in the NIV's production and promotion. This view has not changed, based on Life BPC's website currently displaying what was published in 2000.

The Textus Receptus (TR) and the Majority Text have frequently been used synonymously and while this is largely correct because the Received Text or the TR does represent the majority of textual witnesses in most readings, the TR also contains readings not supported by the majority of extant Greek manuscripts.  The NKJV, which claims its NT to be translated from the Textus Receptus and which has as its principal Editor Arthur L Farstad who endorses the so-called Majority Text of the Greek New Testament he produced with Zane C Hodges, has been found to have in its marginal references variant reading (from the defective Alexandrian manuscripts) to cast doubt on such fundamental doctrines as the Eternal Generation of the Son, the Union of Christ’s Deity and Humanity, the Incarnation and the Blood Atonement, and the Eternal Punishment of the Dead in Hell; it (the NKJV) apparently also has in its actual text Critical Text readings (which deviate from the Received Text) and other unwarranted changes; it also has non-Masoretic readings as variant in its margin for the Old Testament whose executive director, James Price, admitted that he is not a TR advocate and believes that God has preserved the autographic text in the whole body of evidence including in the modern Critical Texts like NA26/27 [Nestles] and UBS [United Bible Societies].  The Critical Text readings in the NKJV have also been acknowledged by Critical Text advocate Mark Ward who had denied there were any such readings but then retracted the acknowledgement by saying that he is still right that there were no Critical Text readings.

The ESV (first published in 2001) and the NIV are critiqued by Timothy Tow and Jeffrey Khoo in their book Theology For Every Christian (2007) and listed together with the NIV, NASB, NKJV and the RSV – all (except NJKV) translated from the Alexandrian/Minority/Wescott-Hort Text and the Nestle-Aland Greek NT – as among the many Bibles of ecumenism, modernism, neo-evangelicalism and neo-fundamentalism. Although the HCSB is not specifically listed, its NT is translated primarily from the United Bible Societies Greek New Testament and Nestle-Aland's Novum Testamentum Graece and Dr Ken Matto has compared 50 verses translated in the HCSB with the same 50 verses translated in the KJV and two other Bibles in the New American Bible ("NAB") of the Roman Catholic Institution and the New World Translation ("NWT") of the Jehovah's Witnesses to see the differences before concluding that (a) the HCSB is as corrupt as the NWT or (b) the NWT is as accurate as the HCSB.

The ESV is adapted from the RSV, the copyright of which is owned by the NCC whose permission was obtained for use of the 1971 revision of the RSV as the basis for the ESV translation work which has resulted in the ESV being 91% the same word-for-word as the RSV – the percentage is even higher when gender-related language changes and the uses of "Thee", "Thou" and "Thine" referring to Deity are ignored. The NCC is a liberal organization that is not a "friend of Evangelical Reformed Theology" and the ESV "generally sticks too closely to the original RSV translation, and therefore the text is still tainted by liberal theology".

The Zion Serangoon BPC's paper of 7 July 2015 (see above) promotes the ESV as having certain advantages over the KJV and lists among the references made in the study by the Session and the Board of Deacons for the issuance of the paper Dr Joel Grassi's A Critical Analysis of the English Standard Version of 2001.  Grassi, however, concludes his analysis of the ESV on p. 41 with five conclusions adverse to its use and a prayer at the end: "May the LORD's churches see the ESV for what it really is: a subtle attack upon the words of God by an enemy who knows what he is doing".

VPP 
Those who embrace the VPP doctrine believe that God has preserved, down to the last detail, all of Scripture without any loss of the original words, prophecies, promises, commandments, doctrines, and truths.

The FEBC expands on the above with its explanation that "verbal" means "every word to the jot and tittle" (Ps 12:6–7, Matt 5:18) and "plenary" means "the Scripture as a whole with all the words intact" (Matt 24:35, 1 Pet 1:25) so that VPP means the whole of Scripture with all its words even to the jot and tittle is perfectly preserved by God without any loss of the original words, prophecies, promises, commandments, doctrines, and truths, not only in the words of salvation, but also the words of history, geography and science: every book, every chapter, every verse, every word, every syllable, every letter is infallibly preserved by the Lord Himself to the last iota.

Timothy Tow on VPP 
VPP was not in issue when the KJV was the Bible in the English language used exclusively by the Singapore BPC for public reading, preaching and teaching (see KJV and Modern English Bibles above).  However, as the modern versions of the English Bible introduced since the 80's in some BP churches have their New Testament translated from different underlying Greek texts, i.e., the Critical Texts of Westcott and Hort compared with the Received Text/Traditional Text/Textus Receptus for the KJV, a study or research into the original language texts in Hebrew, Aramaic and Greek underlying the various versions of the English Bible became necessary since Timothy Tow had been schooled to accept everything taught by Westcott and Hort on the Greek New Testament when he was a student in Faith Seminary in 1948, just as D A Waite was also taught the same thing in Dallas Seminary at the same time.  After studying into the research of Westcott and Hort by Edward F Hills, a classmate of Carl McIntire at Westminster Seminary, Timothy Tow was convinced that the teachings of Westcott and Hort were "poison to our souls".

D A Waite visited FEBC in 1992 (p. 175, Heritage & Legacy).  He spoke at Calvary Pandan BPC, as well as FEBC, on the textual issue and defended the KJV and its underlying texts.  After he had spoken in a "Bible for Today" seminar held at Calvary Pandan BPC and proven from Scripture that God has preserved His Word to the last word, Timothy Tow told Waite, "We are of the same wavelength."  Waite, who is the author of Defending the King James Bible (first published 1992), says "that the WORDS of the Received Greek and Masoretic Hebrew texts that underlie the KING JAMES BIBLE are the very WORDS which God has PRESERVED down through the centuries, being the exact WORDS of the ORIGINALS themselves".  After Waite's visit, FEBC rejected Bruce Metzger's book on textual criticism The Text of the New Testament which was required reading for the college's Greek courses and changed to the use of only the Traditional Hebrew Masoretic Text and the Greek Textus Receptus published by the Trinitarian Bible Society ("TBS") in its biblical language and literature classes while the KJV continues to be the only acceptable version for use in the college's English Bible courses.

Writing God's Special Providential Care of the Scripture in the Bible Witness (Vol 2:4 October–December 2002), Timothy Tow affirmed his belief that the Textus Receptus (Received Text) of the KJV is preserved intact for the church so that "we can say we have the Word of God in our hands" – "kept pure in all ages", says the WCF – while modern Bible versions such as the NIV, which has Westcott and Hort's "corrupt" NT text with "changes and deletions in 9,900 places", are not.

Timothy Tow, like Ian Paisley and Edward F Hills, saw VPP as complementary to the doctrine of Verbal Plenary Inspiration ("VPI") and went on to write: "We believe the preservation of Holy Scripture and its Divine inspiration stand in the same position as providence and creation. If Deism teaches a Creator who goes to sleep after creating the world is absurd, to hold to the doctrine of inspiration without preservation is equally illogical. … Without preservation, all the inspiration, God-breathing into the Scriptures, would be lost. But we have a Bible so pure and powerful in every word and it is so because God has preserved it down through the ages."

FEBC and Life BPC on VPP 
In line with the founding principal Timothy Tow's view, FEBC regards VPP to be a doctrine as old as the Bible itself which must be received by faith together with the VPI doctrine, and FEBC asserts as among its seven tenets of VPP the following: (1) the VPP doctrine is based on WCF 1:8 which teaches that God has supernaturally preserved each and every one of His inspired Hebrew/Aramaic OT words and Greek NT words to the last jot and tittle so that His people will always have in their possession His infallible and inerrant Word kept intact without the loss of any word ((), (2) the "providential" preservation of Scriptures is understood as God's special and not general providence; (3) the Bible is not only infallible and inerrant in the past (in the Autographs), but also infallible and inerrant today (in the Apographs);  and (4) the infallible and inerrant words of Scripture are found in the faithfully preserved Traditional/Byzantine/Majority manuscripts and fully represented in the Printed and Received Text (or Textus Receptus) that underlie the Reformation Bibles best represented by the KJV, and NOT in the corrupted and rejected texts of Westcott and Hort that underlie the many modern versions of the English Bible.

A majority of the Session of Life BPC in 2002, even though still pastored by Timothy Tow then, did not agree with the FEBC on the VPP doctrine which became an issue when Lim Teck Chye ("TC Lim"), an elder who had promoted among the leaders of LBPC the anti-KJV book One Bible Only? – Examining Exclusive Claims for the King James Bible (Roy Beacham and Kevin Bauder (Editors), Grand Rapids: Kregel, 2001), hereinafter  One Bible Only?, spoke at its Adult Sunday School and distributed a paper Preserving Our Godly Path (signed by 21 leaders) on 1 December 2002 during which Jeffrey Khoo, who was present, was not given an opportunity to respond to TC Lim's view of "jot and tittle" preservation being only a theory (p. 9, Preserving Our Godly Path).  The paper (undated) currently on Life BPC's website has apparently been amended as it refers (on p. 2) to Jeffrey Khoo's article A Plea for a Perfect Bible in the January 2003 issue of The Burning Bush defending the infallibility and inerrancy of the  Greek Scriptures on which the KJV is based as a new view.  (Khoo's article had been presented to the FEBC's Basic Theology for Everyone night class on Soteriology on 3 October 2002.)

Among the views in One Bible Only? are:  (a) the Bible has no verse which explains how God will preserve His Word or teaches that God did preserve perfectly the original text of Scripture; (b) the preservation verses (e.g., Matthew 5:18, Matthew 24:35, Mark 13:31, Luke 21:33 and Psalm 12:6-7) cited by preservationists or VPPists as supporting the perfect preservation of God's Word by His special providence do not do so but they point rather to God's Word on the protection of His people (not His words) and on prophecies not failing but will all come to pass; (c) God's Word has not been perfectly or  miraculously preserved in that some words might have been lost through negligence but the amount lost is so small that there is no effect on overall doctrine;  (d) there are errors in the Hebrew manuscripts of the Old Testament such as the discrepancy between 2 Kings 8:26 and 2 Chronicles 22:2 regarding the age of king Ahaziah which needs correction by conjectural emendation; (e) God has providentially preserved His Word not in one manuscript or text type but in and through "all the extant manuscripts, versions and other copies of Scripture" (including Westcott and Hort's Greek New Testament); (f) no two manuscripts, no two editions of the Masoretic Text and no two editions of the Greek Textus Receptus are exactly the same; (g) the Scriptures teach only inspiration and inerrancy for only the autographs; and (h) our Bibles are reliable despite the non-perfect preservation of God's Word.

Apparently plagiarising the views of anti-KJV and anti-Preservation writers, the signatories of Preserving Our Godly Path made no reference to the anti-KJV book One Bible Only? promoted by TC Lim (see above) while adopting its views and modifying (e) above to limit the preservation of God's Word to only the Majority Text, Byzantine Text and Received Text (all editions) so as not to displace the long-entrenched position of Life BPC established by Timothy Tow in the use of the KJV as the exclusive English Bible for public reading, preaching and teaching (pp. 3–5 and 12, Preserving Our Godly Path).  Other writers such as A. A. Hodge (p. 8,) and Rowland S Ward (pp. 9 and 13), who hold to similar views of the Bible being preserved only in essential purity (p. 8) by God's general providence without being 'jot and tittle' perfect (pp. 8–9), were instead cited with approval in Preserving Our Godly Path.

In Preserving Our Godly Path, on pp. 9–10, Life BPC quotes with approval the view of Rowland S Ward who sees (1) Matthew 5:18 as not referring to the transmission of the Scripture text; (2) the "jot and tittle" in the verse cannot produce a perfectly preserved text  to serve as the ultimate standard of appeal; (3) the "Received Text" is not the best (NT) text that can be constructed from the Byzantine family of manuscripts as it is largely the text constructed from a few manuscripts of that family and the ingenuity of Erasmus and (4) that those whose Bibles are translated from the "impure" stream  can also have the same appeal to inerrancy (pity them if they cannot) as the KJV since all the versions accepted by the churches usually agree, although they may differ and be defective at several minor points [these are the words of William Ames, a Puritan minister, quoted by Ward and emboldened and italicized by Life BPC for emphasis without doing the same for the critical qualifier in the words or sentence immediately after, "We must not rest forever in any accepted version, but faithfully see to it that a pure and faultless interpretation is given to the church";  VPPists are not opposed to translations as long as they have been faithfully translated from authentic  original language Hebrew and Greek Scripture texts or words: the beginning of the quote  on p. 9, "The Scriptures … ought not to be translated into other languages …" seems to paint that VPPists are opposed to translating the Bible into other languages – see "Isaac Ong joins in" below on the FEBC encouraging the translation of the Bible into foreign languages)]. Ward sees all manuscripts as preserved by God's providence without distinction or discrimination and is open to accepting bibles translated not from the same underlying texts as the KJV in the RSV (1956) and the ESV (2002, 2011, 2016), which use the 'less interpretative' approach for their translations, as well as the Good News Bible (1976) and the New Living Translation (1996), which use the 'dynamic equivalence' approach for their translations; Ward seems to prefer also the NKJV (1983) over the KJV, even though both have the same underlying texts and are translated from the 'less interpretative' approach, but footnote variations in the NKJV as well as the modern translations seem to appeal to Ward, and the NIV (1984, 2011) is seen by Ward as acceptable in conveying meaning with clarity and accuracy.

When Life BPC held its Annual Congregational Meeting ("ACM") on 25 April 2004, the then Assistant Pastors, Charles Seet and Colin Wong, and the four non-VPP elders issued Our Statement of Faith on the Preservation of God's Word – which appears to support the VPP position – to persuade members of the church that they too hold to the full preservation of God's Word and to vote out the VPP elders, who had refused to accept Pastor Tow's resignation.  The version, currently on Life BPC's website, was amended for re-issuance on 8 November 2005 to add the names of three new non-VPP elders (who were previously deacons: see Preserving Our Godly Path).

Although Our Statement of Faith on the Preservation of God's Word on p. 2 states that "God has preserved His Word in the body of manuscripts (or texts or copies) after the original autographs were lost", D.A. Waite was criticised on pp. 3 and 13 of Preserving Our Godly Path for taking the view "that the words of the received Greek and Masoretic Hebrew texts that underlie the King James Bible are the very words which God has preserved down through the centuries, being the exact words of the originals themselves".  Seet, Wong and the Life BPC elders in Our Statement of Faith on the Preservation of God's Word (p. 2) take a different view as they do not ascribe perfection (i.e., no errors) to the Hebrew and Greek texts underlying the KJV English Bible even though they state on the same page, as well as on p. 2 of Preserving Our Godly Path, that they have no doubt that the KJV "is the very Word of God".  Han Soon Juan, who was one of the VPP elders ousted at the ACM of Life BPC on 25 April 2004 from the governance of the church (see above), finds it bewildering that they could claim the KJV is the very Word of God but yet believe the texts it was translated from contain errors as it escapes him "how the translation could be superior to the original texts".

The late Garnet Howard Milne (hereinafter Milne) in Has the Bible been kept pure? The Westminster Confession of Faith and the providential preservation of Scripture (hereinafter Has the Bible been kept pure?) says that politicians and theologians today often speak ambiguously to appeal to those they disagree with or to deceive those they speak to. In addition to Preserving Our Godly Path and Our Statement of Faith on the Preservation of God's Word, Life BPC's stance on the VPP issue can be examined at  Our Stand on the Preservation of Scriptures, which also has articles from the Chinese Session of Calvary Pandan BPC and BP ministers such as Philip Heng and Jack Sin.  The FEBC's VPP stand can also be examined at  Articles in Defence of Verbal Plenary Preservation, which has articles also from non-FEBC members such as Thomas Strouse, Edward Hills and Robert Sargent.

Tang Poh Geok joins in 
Although the main difference between Charles Seet (Life BPC) and Jeffrey Khoo (FEBC) is in the latter holding to a present perfect Bible in the VPP doctrine compared to the former who does not, Tang Poh Geok ("PG Tang") – a B-P church member who held herself out as a lecturer in Law and Psychology with a PhD – wrote to Quek Suan Yew ("SY Quek"), the pastor of Calvary Pandan BPC, on 1 February 2008 to allege, inter alia, that he is "a modern heretic because he holds to a miraculous preservation as concocted by Rev Dr Jeffrey [Khoo]" and "is falsely accusing Rev Charles Seet and the BOE Life B‐P Church that there are mistakes in the Word of God".

General or Special Providence? 
In Has the Bible been kept pure?, Milne (p. 108) says that a special providence, not a general providence, is in view in WCF 1:8 which emphasises  the personal nature of God's intentions to preserve the original language texts for the use of His church in all ages. Milne (p. 162), citing Thomas Watson's A Body of Practical Divinity (p. 13), says that Watson in Q2 of the Westminster Catechism affirms the [m]iraculous preservation of it [the Scriptures] in all ages' thus: "We may know the Scripture to be the Word of God by its miraculous preservation in all ages … The devil and his agents have been blowing at Scripture light, but could never blow it out; a clear sign that it was lighted from heaven. Nor has the church of God, in all revolutions and changes, kept the Scripture that it should not be lost only, but that it should not be depraved. The letter of Scripture has been preserved, without any corruption, in the original tongue."

Even the liberal Joseph McCabe (deceased 1955) conceded: “Until the seventeenth century divines had assumed that Providence had miraculously guarded its inspired books.”

VPPist Thomas Ross takes the view that the preservation of God’s Word was not controlled by God in the same miraculous manner as the original writers of Scripture were inspired (2 Timothy 3:16) but “accurate copies of the Greek, Hebrew and Aramaic autographa are God’s Word, having in them the breath of God (Matthew 4:4) in the same manner that the original manuscripts were the Word of God, inasmuch as the words of such copies are identical to the words of the autographs”. However, viewed from another perspective, Ross sees the preservation of God’s Word as a miracle as he does not see why the God who works all things after the counsel of His own will could not have sovereignly made it happen without the kind of direct intervention in history that was the same as the kind that makes blind men see, Christ rises from the dead, etc. and Kent Brandenburg adds, “I can explain the miracle, but I can’t fully understand it because it is a miracle. The alternative is not believing God and having errors in Scripture, which is acceptable to textual critics and many modern MVO [Multi-Versions Only] people.”  Ian Paisley, in a sermon preached by him, says: “The Bible is still with us. It has been miraculously and mysteriously preserved. The many promises of God concerning its preservation have been gloriously fulfilled.”

Unlike VPP proponents, VPP opponents take the view that “non-miraculous” preservation means non-perfect preservation, i.e. there is no perfect Bible today because the autographic text has not been perfectly preserved in the apographa, which have errors and omissions, as “providentially preserved” means to such people that the Bible is only essentially, and not exactly, preserved – see One Bible Only?, 114-123 and Preserving Our Godly Path, 7-9.  The authors of One Bible Only? say the “doctrine of preservation was not a doctrine of the ancient church” but “first appeared in a church creed in the Westminster Confession of Faith of 1647 (I.VIII)” (One Bible Only?, 116).

Milne in Has the Bible been kept pure? (p. 163) indicates that “[a] source for both the phrase ‘the singular care and providence’ of God and the proof text of Matt 5:18 in WCF 1:8 might well have been Johannes Buxtorf Sr. (1564–1629), Professor of Hebrew at Basel” and, if this is the case, “then this is further evidence that the divines had in mind the preservation of the words of the text and not only sense and doctrine when they wrote that both the Hebrew Old Testament and the Greek New Testament were ‘by His singular care and providence, kept pure in all ages, [and] are therefore authentical’” – Johannis Buxtorfi, Tiberias, sive Commentarius Masorethicus (Basileae: Rauracorum: Ludovic Konig, MDCXX).  The word “singular” means “separate from others by reason of superiority or pre-eminence, – 1635 … above the ordinary in amount, extent, worth or value; especially good or great; special, particular … remarkable, extraordinary, unusual, uncommon … standing alone, peculiar in this respect – 1791 … [d]ifferent from or not complying with that which is customary, usual, or general; strange, odd, peculiar 1684”.

In Providence Of God In Preserving Scripture, Paul J Barth quotes from the writings of Puritans William Ames (1576–1633), John Flavel (1627–1691), Edward Leigh (1602–1671) and John Owen (1616–1683), Scottish Commissioner at the Westminster Assembly George Gillespie (1613–1648), German Reformed theologian Amandus Polanus (1561–1610) and current Reformed theologian Richard Muller.  The article, with many Scripture references as well as references to WCF 1:1, 1:8 and 5:7 and Q18 of the Westminster Larger Catechism, is clear that God’s special providence – as distinguished from His general providence – is involved by His special care in the preservation of His Word for the definite purpose intended; that Christ promises to be with the Church “always, even unto the end of the world” (Mat. 28:20) and therefore “Scripture must exist until the end of the world for the fulfillment of this divine command in each generation of the church … [as] Scripture contains the teaching necessary to the work of the church, without which the church could not function”; that Scripture is not merely inerrant in its autographs, it is also infallible in those Hebrew and Greek faithful copies that the universal Church has passed down to us today; and that asserting that these texts of Scripture have been preserved in the same way as any other work of antiquity seems “to border on atheism”, per Owen, as “[s]uch a supposition neglects the special providence that God exercises with regard to his Church, the holy Scriptures being “most necessary (2 Tim 3:15; 2 Pet 1:19)” for the “better preserving and propagating of the truth, and for the more sure establishment and comfort of the Church against the corruption of the flesh, and the malice of Satan and of the world” (WCF 1:1) since at this point in redemptive history (Heb. 1:1-2) it is now the exclusive way in which [H]e infallibly communicates [H]is will to [H]is Bride”.

B B Warfield and Inerrancy 
PG Tang took offence to SY Quek putting down those who hold to B B Warfield's position on the Doctrine of Inspiration of the Bible.  However, even though Warfield is a venerable Christian scholar, his adoption of the Westcott and Hort textual critical theory and redefinition of the doctrine of biblical inerrancy to make it apply only to the autographs with the consequent uncritical acceptance of the theory by Princeton Seminary and evangelical and fundamental seminaries led to the Textus Receptus being replaced by the United Bible Societies and the Nestle-Aland Critical Texts as the text in NT studies and the birth of more than a hundred modern English versions of the Bible from the mutilated (shortened) and corrupt Westcott-Hort text causing confusion over the infallibility, inerrancy and authority of the Scriptures.

Milne (pp. 36–37) in Has the Bible been kept pure? says Warfield shows his confusion as he attempts in The Inerrancy of the Original Autographs (see  "Theme Classic: The Inerrancy of the Original Autographs (1893)" in Midwestern Journal of Theology, 10.2 (Fall 2011): 55-61) to dismiss the criticisms of his opponents who had claimed he was appealing to the inerrancy of a non-existent 'autographic codex' to justify modern textual criticism which undermines the traditional text of Scripture [Warfield adopted lower criticism to save the Bible from higher criticism by relegating inspiration to the inscrutable autographs] and in spite of his countering that he was talking about "that genuine text of Scripture which is 'by the singular care and providence of God (WCF 1:8)' still preserved to us … [and] to it alone that authority and trustworthiness and utter truthfulness are to be ascribed", his countering is clearly untenable because while he acknowledges that the Westminster divines believed that God had preserved the Scriptures to which 'authority and trustworthiness and utter truthfulness are to be ascribed', he [Warfield] clearly teaches that the text of the Bible is still not settled, and indeed may never be, because of mistakes and missing words in the text requiring conjectural emendation – the view of Westcott and Hort.

Milne (pp. 25 & 27) notes Warfield shares a seemingly identical position with A. A. Hodge and William G.T. Shedd who, in Calvinism: Pure and Mixed. A Defence of the Westminster Standards (New York: Charles Scribner's Sons, 1893, p. 142), views the process of the subsequent copying of the absolutely pure autographa as "not supernatural and preclusive of all error, but providential and allowing for some error", similar to Warfield who, in An Introduction to the Textual Criticism of the New Testament (New York: Thomas Whittaker, 1889, p. 12), says that each manuscript copy "was made laboriously and erroneously from a previous one, perpetuating its errors, old and new, and introducing still newer ones of its own manufacture … until, after a thousand years or so, the number of fixed errors becomes considerable".   In Preserving Our God Path, Charles Seet and the BOE cited with approval Hodge (p. 8) and Warfield (p. 13).

Milne (pp. 44–46) remarks that Warfield was caught up in the excitement of the late nineteenth century – an age markedly different to that of the Puritan divines – when "there was much optimism that momentous discoveries through the new sciences were bringing powerful insights into how to understand both man's past and the contemporary world"; this led Warfield to enthusiastically embrace modern textual criticism and a theory of biological evolution – his wholehearted adoption of the former, including at least some of the views of critics like Westcott and Hort, by his apparent interpretation of the WCF 1:8 to comply with their views in adopting an inductive approach to reconstruct the New Testament, and his laying the groundwork for others to embrace theistic evolution in the latter – which turned Princeton Seminary ultimately to pure liberalism and its departure from the presupposition of Reformed orthodoxy that "the Scripture was the precipium cognoscendi, the first principle of religious knowledge".

The American Presbyterian Church ("APC") says Warfield was a product of his age and shared in some of its incipient errors.   The APC says both the VPI and VPP doctrines are crucial and they stand or fall together as "there is no purpose in maintaining that God preserved some uninspired scriptures that are neither infallible nor inerrant" and "[s]imilarly it is meaningless to contend that the Church once possessed an inspired and infallible bible, but it was not providentially preserved and has been lost and the best we now have is a corrupted facsimile … the latter [of which] is exactly the position that Warfield took".  The APC says it holds to the historic position of the Reformed Churches on the Biblical text being the Masoretic Text of the Hebrew Scriptures and the Textus Receptus or "Received Text" of the Greek Scriptures and stands with Reformed churches which hold to the view that "we have the actual Greek New Testament, as given by God to his church", and "not just some kind of reasonable facsimile thereof" as the APC still believes that "we had the very word of God, providentially preserved through the ages, and therefore authoritative, inerrant, and inspired".

Perfect Bible (VPP) – doctrine or heresy? 
SY Quek replied PG Tang on 2 February 2008 by pointing out her oversights, her misunderstanding of the NIV "translation" and NIV's differences with the KJV; he also inquired if she had obtained a statement from Charles Seet and the BOE of Life BPC on "whether they believed that we have a perfect Bible (original languages and not a translation) today" and if they should say so, to request them also in writing to identify "which [Bible] is perfect or has no mistakes" and to explain "how they identified it". SY said he would be happy to apologise and retract what he had written if "they all [Seet and BOE of Life BPC] believe we have a perfect Bible today" but if not, he hoped that PG would have the courtesy to withdraw her allegations with an apology in writing. SY ended his reply by citing Bible verses to support the VPP doctrine and requesting PG to reconsider the VPP doctrine.

PG responded on 4 February 2008 without the evidence requested, alleged that Jeffrey Khoo has three formulae for VPP and concluded with asserting that she can never be a believer of VPP and "out rightly reject it as a HERESY" (capitalised by PG).  But the Court of Appeal (coram: Chao Hick Tin, Andrew Phang Boon Leong and V.K. Rajah JJ.A) on 26 April 2011 unanimously held – after examining WCF 1:8 in Life BPC's unsuccessful lawsuit to expel the FEBC or its directors from operating the FEBC on the Gilstead Road premises – that the VPP doctrine is not heresy and it is not inconsistent for a Christian who believes fully in the principles contained within the WCF and the VPI (Verbal Plenary Inspiration) doctrine to also subscribe to the VPP doctrine (see "Leadership of Fundamentalist Faction" above and "Life BPC's Lawsuit Against FEBC" below).

Timothy Tow (prior to August 2004) also said that Seet and Colin Wong "could no longer take the Dean Burgon Oath of swearing allegiance to the Bible to be without mistake to the last syllable and letter" as "[t]hey said they had discovered some mistakes but these did not affect doctrine and were not serious" and he (Tow) had to resign from Life BPC "to stand for a 100% Perfect Bible without mistake" because "[most of] the Session of Life B-P Church took their side".

Psalm 12:6-7 on preservation 
PG Tang in her second letter pointed SY Quek to Doug Kutilek's article Why  is not a Promise of the Infallible Preservation of Scripture published on an anti-KJV website with a misleading or deceptive kjvonly.org domain name. But SY Quek already had his own article  Did God Promise To Preserve His Words?: Interpreting Psalm 12:6–7 published in The Burning Bush, Volume 10, No. 2 (July 2004) where SY pointed to (1) the legitimacy in Hebrew grammar of the feminine plural "words of the LORD" in verse 6 being the antecedent of the masculine plural pronominal suffix "them" (v7a) so that "them" means "words" and not "people" – being also consistent with v7 on the need to consider first the immediate context in v6 (words), and not the more distant context in v5 (people); and (2) the KJV translators were right in translating the masculine singular pronominal suffix "him" with the attached energetic nun (the Hebrew letter n) as a masculine plural pronoun "them" in v7b.

Matthew Poole takes the view that verse 7 on God's preservation refers to:  "(1) the poor and needy, ver. 5, from the crafts and malice of this crooked and perverse generation of men, and for ever. Or, (2) The words or promises, last mentioned, ver. 6": Jeffrey Riddle says it can be both.

Kent Brandenburg writes  Psalms 12:6-7: Answering Doug Kutilek's article "Why Psalm 12:6-7 is not a Promise of the Infallible Preservation of Scripture" (updated 12 July 2016) and points therein to an easy-to-read and less lengthy article of  Grace Life School of Theology at  Preservation: Examining the Relevant Passages, Psalm 12:6-7 that discusses the "grammatical argument" and gives several examples from the Psalms and other parts of the Hebrew Old Testament showing where feminine nouns with masculine pronouns are used to refute Kutilek's argument.  David Cloud wrote as far back as the 1980s    the preservation of God's Word in Psalm 12:6-7 to answer not only Kutilek but others who claim to be fundamentalists but deny or question the preservation of God's Word.

Carl McIntire understood Psalm 12:7 to mean preservation of the divinely inspired words of God as he had preached in 1992 a sermon entitled "Help, Lord!", from Psalm 12, saying:

CUV in VPP debate 
PG Tang in her second letter to SY Quek accused Jeffrey Khoo of "dishonesty and deception" in using different formulations for the perfect Bible and sometimes inferring it to be only the KJV (p. 3 of her second letter).  But Jeffrey Khoo in Questions and Answers on the KJV (2003) says that the "Perfect Bible" is the inspired Hebrew/Aramaic and Greek Scriptures underlying the KJV, and not the KJV itself as "[n]o translated words can be better than the inspired Hebrew/Aramaic and Greek words" and "[t]he KJV and other accurate and reliable translations are like the common yardstick, though not 100% are good and safe enough for use" while "the original language Scripture underlying the KJV is like the perfect platinum yardstick of the Smithsonian Institute [Institution], inerrant, infallible, authoritative".

Although glad to note at the beginning of her second letter that SY Quek in his response to her first letter had shown her some respect as "a person saved in Jesus Christ", PG took issue with SY Quek and SH Tow for seemingly regarding the Chinese Union Version ("CUV") as the "Perfect Bible" despite the original language texts used for translating its NT being the same Westcott and Hort Greek text underlying the English Revised Version (p. 4).  But they (SY Quek and SH Tow) only regarded the CUV as the "Word of God", not the "Perfect Bible", for the Chinese people today since it is the best in terms of faithfulness, reliability and accuracy among the Chinese versions presently available, and versions or translations (whether the KJV or the CUV) are never superior to the inspired and preserved Hebrew, Aramaic and Greek Scriptures which need to be consulted for clarity and fullness of meaning and to compare Scripture with Scripture – which is VPP; this seventh tenet was put up by the FEBC so as not to undermine the Chinese brethren's confidence in their Bible.

Jeffrey Khoo notes that although the CUV was based on the Revised Version of Westcott and Hort, it does not slavishly follow it. And unlike the NIV which omits entire verses like Matt 17:21, 18:11, 23:14, Mark 7:16, 11:26, 15:28, Luke 17:36, 23:17, John 5:4, Acts 8:37, 15:34, 24:7, 28:29, all these verses are found in the CUV which, like the KJV, is a faithful translation that upholds the deity of Christ; he also notes that the CUV follows the KJV in 1 Tim 3:16 calling Jesus "God" in "God (Shen) was manifest in the flesh" ["神 在 肉 身 顯 現"] and as such, the CUV is superior to the corrupt NIV so that he would have no problem holding up the CUV and saying, "This is the Word of God". Khoo also points out that VPPists, unlike Ruckmanites, do not take the view that "… (7) the KJV is the only Bible that has gospel or salvific content; (8) those who do not use the KJV are condemned to hell; and (9) all non-English speaking believers must learn English to know the Truth".

PG Tang says the NIV also has Matt 18:11, Luke 9:55-56, Acts 8:37 and Luke 2:33.  However, they are not found in the text (body) of the NIV but in the footnotes in small print at the bottom of the page. Because the CUV is typeset vertically (to be read from top to bottom and from right to left), the same verses listed by Jeffrey Khoo are printed in the main body of the CUV, sometimes in two vertical lines/columns of characters of slightly smaller print in the expanded column space from offsets to both the right and the left, as in the notes on Matt 18:11, "有 古 卷 在 此 有：人 子 来 ，为 要 拯 救 失 丧 的 人"("some ancient scrolls have:  'The Son of Man comes to save the lost'"), placed directly below the last character 面 (face) and the adjacent period mark of the CUV verse in the main text or body of the CUV.

Even though PG seems to agree with SY that Luke 2:33 is correctly translated from the Greek text as "Joseph" in "And Joseph and his mother marvelled …" (KJV) instead of "[t]he child's father" in "The child's father and mother marvelled …" (NIV) as the latter undermines the deity and virgin birth of Christ (since Jesus was conceived by the Holy Spirit), PG says that SY ought to apply the same criticisms to the NIV to also the CUV which also translates Luke 2:33 as "The  child's father and mother marvelled …".

Charles Seet in "The Inside Story of Westcott and Hort" – printed in the January 1998 issue of "The Burning Bush" (pp. 32–38), more than four years prior to VPP becoming an issue (in 2002) – wrote on the lives,  work, beliefs, secret beliefs and practices of Westcott and Hort, as well as their fruit, before concluding on the very extensive damage done by them so that any modern version of the New Testament based on the work of Westcott and Hort, no matter how good in other ways, is "clearly blemished" and that "[t]hose who want to honour the Word of God must not promote the use of any of these versions by the church, not because the content of the version is evil in itself, but because the attitude of being contented to use a blemished version rather than an existing unblemished one, dishonours God." But Life BPC on its website at "Our Stand on the Preservation of Scriptures" has the bilingual "Why We Do Not Accept the Doctrine of Verbal Plenary Preservation (VPP)" published by the Chinese Session of Calvary Pandan BPC in March 2008 which promotes the CUV and modern English Bible versions as well as paints a different picture of the lives of Westcott and Hort.

NIV, KJV and their texts 
Footnotes in the NIV are likely to be ignored or missed. However, even if they are read, missing verses or words which have remarks in the footnotes such as "not found in any Greek manuscript before the sixteenth century" give the impression that such verses or words (being in the footnotes) are not part of God's Word; and even if the verses or words are in the text itself but qualified by "some manuscripts do not have or say this and that" is analogous to Satan in the garden of Eden asking Eve, "Yea, hath God said?" and casting doubts on God's Word.  SY points PG to Mark 16:9-19, which speaks  against the modern signs and wonders movement , and John 7:53-8:11, which is one of the most tender passages on how the Lord mercifully dealt with the woman taken in adultery: these passages are cast in doubt by the notes in the NIV indicating that "[t]he most reliable early manuscripts and  other ancient witnesses do not have Mark 16:9-19" and "[t]he earliest and most reliable manuscripts and other ancient witnesses do not have John 7:53-8:11".

There are more differences than those listed by SY in his exchange with PG as the KJV is based upon the Majority Text that is founded on more than 5,000 New Testament manuscripts while the NIV is based upon the Minority Text that is founded mainly on two corrupted New Testament manuscripts, as pointed out by Richard Anthony at  Comparisons between The Majority (KJV) and Minority (NIV) Texts; see also  KJV-NIV Verse Comparisons on the differences between the two versions.

The Majority Text, called the Universal Text by Samuel C. Gipp, is also known as the Byzantine Text, the Imperial Text, the Traditional Text, and the Reformation Text and it culminates in the Textus Receptus or "Received Text", which is the basis for the KJV; the Minority Text (also known as the Egyptian Text, the Hesychian Text, and the Alexandrian Text) is based mainly on the Codex Sinaiticus (discovered by Tischendorf in St. Catharine's Monastery on Mt. Sinai in February 1859 in a wastebasket) and the Codex Vaticanus (placed in the Vatican Library at an unknown date and left there for centuries before being made known in 1841), the foundations for the critical Greek Text of Wescott and Hort of 1881 which, collated with Weymouth's third edition and Tischendorf's eighth edition by Eberhard Nestle in 1898, became what is known as the Nestle's Greek New Testament – the text used in all "modern" translations that are opposed to certain doctrines of Scripture such as the virgin birth, the deity of Christ, the blood atonement, the Trinity, and others.

The Textus Receptus and Majority Text have frequently been used synonymously and while this is largely correct because the Received Text or the TR does represent the majority of textual witnesses in most readings, the TR also contains readings not supported by the majority of extant Greek manuscripts.  The "Majority Text" claimed by Zane Hodges and Arthur Farstad in their Greek New Testament (1982) is simply a myth since  the extant Greek manuscripts have never been collated and examined in such a way that a "majority text" could be determined with a sufficient degree of certainty.  Von Soden's work was used by Hodges and Farstad for their majority text, with Wilbur Pickering noting that it fell far short of producing the material necessary to determine a pure and definitive majority text as only 80% of the total number of manuscripts known to be in existence were included and the scholars involved in the project collated only "selected ones" from the 4,500 they had at hand.

The "Majority Text" is a statistical construct that does not correspond exactly to any known manuscript, being arrived at by comparing all known manuscripts with one another and deriving from them the readings that are more numerous than any others; however, there is another purported Majority Text  in The New Testament in the Original Greek by Maurice A. Robinson and William G. Pierpont (1991). As the exact Majority Text cannot be determined because no detailed collation of all surviving manuscripts has taken place and even if this should become possible one day, the resultant text could only be provisional and tentative as the discovery of further manuscripts might change minority readings to majority readings, or vice versa, but the doctrine of special providential  preservation – which is the historic, orthodox Protestant position – teaches that the Church is, and always has been, in possession of the true text of Scripture.

The NIV website explains that "the KJV translators included words and verses based on altered copies of later manuscripts, rather than that the modern translation teams have removed these verses" as they were not in the older manuscripts which the modern translators say the KJV translators did not have access to, and whether a verse is in the text or footnotes of the NIV depends on the level of certainty of the NIV translation teams from their research; if their research makes them quite certain that the verse was not in the original text, it is placed only in a footnote and this, according to them, has been done to achieve maximum accuracy and alignment with the oldest manuscripts which are much closer in time to the writing of the Bible.

Robin A. Brace, a well-known admirer of the NIV, however does not agree that the 'older' Bible texts are more reliable, and expresses his disagreement with the 1978 NIV's (warning) note on the reliability of Mark 16:9-19 as he [Brace] points to the existence of other manuscripts dated before and after the Codex Sinaiticus and the Codex Vaticanus as reference points (to support the later manuscripts of the Textus Receptus); he also disagrees with the NIV footnote on   regarding some early manuscripts not having the first sentence ('Jesus said, Father forgive them for they know not what they do') as he says that the expression of this in some manner or other, from his checks with all 19 New Testament versions and about seven of the major Bible commentators, JFB [Jamieson, Fausset & Brown], Gill, Wesley, Henry, Clarke etc. carried out on a day between 10–12 November 2012, revealed no Bible translator panel had thought it a problem and the sentence (found in the Textus Receptus) therefore has "full authority and certainly should be included in all Bibles".

All modern translators give B [Codex Vaticanus] and Aleph [Codex Sinaiticus] unbalanced superiority, assuming them to be more accurate because they assume that they are older, while overlooking the fact that the Universal Text (or Byzantine Text) has manuscripts just as old plus the backing of the church fathers, and they [the modern translators] also seemingly fail to realize that Egypt is NOT the location for the pure text – old manuscripts perhaps, but not pure readings.  The "older" manuscripts are not necessarily "more reliable" for three reasons: (1) the farther back in time, the more skewed and unrepresentative the evidence becomes as the earliest manuscripts were mostly the Alexandrian text-type from Egypt which had suffered corruption by the early third century but survived because of the hyper-arid climate of Egypt being the most favourable climate for manuscript preservation and (unlike the Byzantine text-type) they were not burned during the persecution of Christians under Roman Emperor Diocletian in the early 4th century; (2) there is no scientific correlation between the age of a manuscript and its number of copyist errors as ten generations of transmission under skilled scribes could yield less copyist errors than a single generation of transmission under unskilled scribes with confirmed cases of carelessness by scribes of the "oldest" manuscripts, e.g., the Codex Sinaiticus (with one transmission in 1,500 years) has many words omitted and some unnecessarily repeated; and (3) the existence of modern critical texts ironically rebuts the presumption that only old manuscripts contain reliable readings as later manuscripts can contain early readings in the same way that the Nestle-Aland/United Bible Societies text contains early readings.

Isaac Ong joins in 
Isaac Ong, (Senior) Pastor of Calvary (Jurong) BPC took issue with Carol Lee on VPP by castigating her as relying on emotion and not pursuing truth relentlessly  even though he (Isaac) remarked that "all Bible-believing Christians can and ought to agree and subscribe to" the Scriptural passages (e.g., Matthew 5:18, Matthew 24:35, and Psalm 12:6-7) quoted by Lee in her article A Child of God Looks at the Doctrine of Verbal Plenary Preservation on pp. 69–72 in the July 2005 issue of The Burning Bush to support the VPP doctrine or the entire preservation of God's Word.

Isaac Ong, however, accused Carol Lee of hiding or not stating the real issue  to be that of "those who hold to VPP as a doctrine believe that the Word of God is uniquely, miraculously, and perfectly preserved in one single copy of Greek text known as the Textus Receptus" while upholding "the traditional Hebrew Masoretic Text and Greek Textus  Receptus underlying the King James Bible to be the totally inspired and entirely preserved Word of God" (The Burning Bush, July 2004, p. 65) and identifying themselves as "KJV/TR-Only advocates in their affirmation of the twin doctrines of the verbal and plenary inspiration and preservation of God's words" (The Burning Bush, Jan. 2004, p. 3).

VPP is taught in a 10-lesson course The Doctrine of Verbal Plenary Preservation in which Lee teaches lesson 3 on the foundation or the fundamentals/basics of VPP at  Biblical Support for VPP (I), and Jeffrey Khoo teaches the more advanced phase on the identification of the VPP text or words in  lesson 8 and  lesson 9.  The editorial in The Burning Bush, July 2004, p. 65 cited by Ong says, "The College Board and Faculty affirm the 100% inspiration and 100% preservation of the Holy Scriptures …", before going on to declare univocally "the traditional Hebrew Masoretic Text and Greek Textus Receptus underlying the King James Bible to be the totally inspired and entirely preserved Word of God".  Was Lee, a FEBC faculty member, hiding her view if the July 2004 issue of The Burning Bush had already revealed the FEBC's VPP view, as well as Carol's, before her article A Child of God Looks at the Doctrine of Verbal Plenary Preservation was published in the July 2005 issue?

The January 2004 issue that Ong claims VPPists identify themselves as "KJV-TR only advocates" also precedes the July 2005 issue.  Even though students are taught the Traditional Hebrew Masoretic Text and the Greek Textus Receptus published by the TBS in the college's biblical language and literature classes while the KJV continues to be the only acceptable version for use in the English Bible courses  (see "Timothy Tow on VPP" above), the FEBC does not discourage its foreign students from reading the Bibles in their own native tongues; they are advised to use the best, most accurate, most reliable version that they have in their native language, and to go back to the inspired and preserved original language Scriptures which FEBC has identified to be those behind the faithful KJV, and not the corrupt modern versions, to check for accuracy and fullness of meaning even as FEBC, like the Westminster divines, upholds that the Holy Scriptures "are to be translated into the vulgar language of every nation unto which they come, that, the Word of God dwelling plentifully in all, they may worship Him in an acceptable manner; and through patience and comfort of the Scriptures, may have hope" (WCF 1:8) in the FEBC's reaffirmation of the Biblical Reformed Faith which encourages the accurate translation of foreign language Bibles according to the Reformation Text underlying the KJV. Isaac Ong studied at the FEBC and Bob Jones University ("BJU").

Jeffrey Khoo wrote a response to Isaac Ong's article by quoting Ong and reframing the questions posed by him with asking if "God-fearing and God-honouring Christians" who subscribe to certain fundamental doctrines — including Richard Baxter  (1615–1691), John Owen (1616–1683), John Wesley (1703–1791), John Gill (1697–1771), Charles Spurgeon (1834–1892) Francis Turretin (1623–1687), John William Burgon (1813–1888) and G I Williamson whose words Ong had quoted and Khoo also explained or commented – had indeed rejected the VPP of Scripture, or that they actually believed that: (1) God did not infallibly preserve His words, (2) God did allow some of His inspired words to be utterly lost and completely corrupted without any hope of restoration and (3) God took a "hands off" approach to the preservation of His inspired words and did not care at all to intervene in history to correct the intentional or unintentional mistakes the scribes made in their copying of the Scriptures so as to restore for His people all of His inspired words and identify for them where these are precisely.

When Ong joined the debate somewhat belatedly (his church was portrayed by him as "longsuffering" in silence), probably not long after July 2005, Life BPC had changed its position from non-jot-and-tittle preservation in 2002 to "full preservation" in Our Statement of Faith on the Preservation of God's Word in 2004 – which was done probably out of expediency at the ACM in April 2004 rather than conviction as the "change" was done without quoting in the statement any preservation verses.  (See "FEBC and Life BPC on VPP" above on the issuance of Our Statement of Faith on the Preservation of God's Word at Life BPC's ACM and "Life BPC's Lawsuit against FEBC" below on Life BPC in January 2008 changing or declaring its position to be "non-VPP".)

John Owen's view on preservation 
Isaac Ong quotes Owen's words, "the whole Scripture, entire as given out from God, without any loss, is preserved in the copies [not one particular copy] of the originals yet remaining; what varieties there are among the copies themselves shall be afterward declared. In them all, we say, is every letter and tittle of the word …" but "[not one particular copy]" was added by Isaac to stress that preservation is not in one particular copy.  Ong apparently takes a similar view to Warfield in that the absolute purity of the Word of God can only be found in the copies and not one copy (see also Life BPC making the same point by citing Warfield in their Preserving Our Godly Path in reference [1] on p. 13 with a quote attributed to a Scottish Commissioner at the Westminster Assembly, Samuel Rutherford (1600–1661), and claimed by them on p. 6 at point 4. to be the position of the Westminster divines as well as Life BPC's "old paths" position), but Milne in Has the Bible been kept pure? (p. 32) says that if all Warfield means "is that no one original language Scripture contained the complete autographic text before the New Testament, for example, had been collated by Desiderius Erasmus (1466–1536), Theodore Beza (1519–1605) and Robert Estienne (Stephanus, 1503–1559), then he is compatible with the Westminster view"; but "he [Warfield] seems to imply that the divines thought it was a 'monstrous' thing to claim that they could have the complete text of Scripture bound in one copy and "[i]f this is what Warfield intended, then this would be an extraordinary interpretation of the Confession of Faith and of the Puritan divines who wrote it, and a tragic misrepresentation of their views".

Milne in Has the Bible been kept pure? (pp. 32–33 footnotes) goes on to clarify by pointing out that John Owen  had written "of the common Greek edition of the New Testament" in The Works of John Owen ed. William H. Goold (London: Johnstone and Hunter, 1850), Vol 16, 471 as "the vulgar copy we use was the public possession of many generations, – that upon the invention of printing it was in actual authority throughout the world with them that used and understood that language" and Owen was presumably referring "to the Beza edition of the Greek text", but Warfield seemed to deny the acceptance of the Received Text [i.e., the NT in one copy or book] by the Puritans who were using an edition of it.  While God's Word was not written in one book or copy – as the Old Testament has 39 books written over a long period of time from about 1200 to 165 BC and the New Testament has 27 books written between about 50 and 100 AD –  the Bible can now be read in one book.  The TBS has printed in one book the Bible in the Hebrew and Greek original Biblical languages.

(Milne in Has the Bible been kept pure? (p. 233), having studied into the writings of many Westminster divines including the unpublished manuscripts of Rutherford kept in the National Library of Scotland in Edinburgh and Rutherford's The Divine Right of Church Government and Excommunication (p. 66) and quoted them in Milne's book, says “Rutherford teaches that the inspired words of the Holy Spirit, which constitute Scripture, are still extant” (present tense stressed by Milne) and “Rutherford believed those same words were present in the received texts of both the Old and New Testaments”.)

Prior to addressing Isaac Ong on John Owen, Khoo points out that Richard Baxter was simply making a true observation that there are "various readings and doubtful texts" even as he [Baxter] did not deny that every God-breathed word of the Sacred Scriptures to the last iota has been preserved – which is VPP that does not deny that there are "various readings" in the copies, but the correct reading has always been preserved, and has been identified from the multitude of faithful manuscripts, and through the successive editions of the Textus Receptus as the Lord guided His servants (from Erasmus, to Stephanus, then Beza, and finally the King James men) to restore or identify the true reading of the Greek NT (in one copy or book).

Jeffrey Khoo says that VPPists do not deny what Owen had written; Khoo then points Isaac Ong to Khoo's own article   John Owen on the Perfect Bible on Owen affirming the present perfection of Scripture in that while "we have not the Autographa of Moses and the prophets, of the apostles and evangelists; but the Apographa or 'copies' which we have contain every iota that was in them".  He [Khoo] also asserts in his response to Ong's paper (responding to Carol Lee's paper) that  Owen – unlike many of today's fundamentalists (like those from BJU) who say that God has not preserved His words, but only His message, or truth, or doctrine – believed in the preservation of the words of Scripture (ie, verbal preservation), not just the doctrines (i.e., conceptual preservation), as Owen had written, "Nor is it enough to satisfy us, that the doctrines mentioned are preserved entire; every tittle and iota in the Word of God must come under our care and consideration, as being, as such, from God".

Khoo also points Ong to John Owen on the Perfect Bible on Owen writing, "But what, I pray, will it advantage us that God did so once deliver his word, if we are not assured also that that word so delivered hath been, by his special care and providence, preserved entire and uncorrupt unto us, or that it doth not evidence and manifest itself to be his word, being so preserved?"  Khoo goes on to say that if God's Word is not perfect today, fully preserved, we simply cannot appeal to it as our sure and steadfast, final and supreme rule of faith and practice.  Even as Owen himself had written regarding "the copies": "In them all, we say, is every letter and tittle of the word.  These copies, we say, are the rule, standard, and touchstone of all translations, ancient or modern, by which they are in all things to be examined, tried, corrected, amended; and themselves only by themselves."

Isaac Ong goes further by quoting some more of Owen's words, "Translations contain the word of God, and are the word of God, perfectly or imperfectly, according as they express the words, sense, and meaning of those originals. To advance any, all translations concurring, into an equality with the originals – so to set them by it as to set them up with it on even terms – much more to propose and use them as means of castigating, amending, altering any thing in them, gathering various lections by them, is to set up an altar of our own by the altar of God, and to make equal the wisdom, care, skill, and diligence of men, with the wisdom, care, and providence of God himself".  Ong seems to think of the originals here as the autographa but can translations be made from or compared against the autographa which no longer exist?  Or are translations – the product of the wisdom, care, skill and diligence of men (per Owen) – made from the apographa preserved by the wisdom, care and providence of God Himself (per Owen and WCF 1:8) so that they can be compared against the apographa to see if alterations or amendments to any translations are needed?   Richard A Muller wrote in Post Reformation Reformed Dogmatics (2nd Edition, Baker Academic), Volume 2, Holy Scripture: The Cognitive Foundation of Theology, p. 433:

Francis Turretin on real contradictions 
Jeffrey Khoo says Isaac Ong was extremely vague on what Turretin says about "contradictions" as Ong seems to give the impression that Turretin actually believed that there are "real contradictions" in the Bible in Ong's quotation of Turretin in Institutes of Elenctic Theology (hereinafter Institutes), volume I, page 71.  After transposing the ultimate question (as slightly amended by Ong), "Do real contradictions occur in the Scripture?", by moving it to the front, Ong then quotes the other questions, "The question does not concern … Rather the question is … The question is not … The question is whether … ", and stops short at "… of parallel passages" (underlined below) without going on to quote or deal with the ultimate question plus its answer (both in bold italics) in the full quote below:

Transposing the ultimate question and then reframing the other questions before it as definitions of "real contradictions" without answering the ultimate question changed the impact, as what Turretin was saying – with the ultimate question in its original position (as in the full quote above) – is, regardless of what (other) questions are posed or not posed, there are no real or true contradictions in the copies or apographs.

Unless Khoo was saying that he could not find Turretin taking the view that there are "real contradictions", Khoo is not really correct in saying that he could not find "real contradictions" at all in Turretin's Institutes (at least not in the place cited by Ong). However, while the two words are not next to one another, they are (spaced or separated) in the question: "Are there real and true, and not merely apparent, contradictions?".  Khoo quotes Turretin, "Unless unimpaired integrity characterize the Scriptures, they [the Scriptures] could not be regarded as the sole rule of faith and practice, and the door would be thrown wide open to atheists, libertines, enthusiasts, and other profane persons like them for destroying its authenticity (authentian) and overthrowing the foundation of salvation. For since nothing false can be an object of faith, how could the Scriptures be held as authentic and reckoned divine if liable to contradictions and corruptions?" before remarking that such a rhetorical question expects a negative answer, viz. "Turretin denies that there are any contradictions or corruptions in the Scriptures!" (bold italics by Khoo); he also quotes  p. 70 of Turretin's Institutes, "Finally, others defend the integrity of the Scriptures and say that these various contradictions are only apparent, not real and true; that certain passages are hard to be understood (dysnoeta), but not altogether inexplicable (alyta). This is the more common opinion of the orthodox, which we follow as safer and truer", and he follows up immediately with: "This has all along been the primary contention and constant plea of VPP advocates in defending our Perfect Bible." (See also the fifth tenet of VPP.)

In the Table of Contents on p. viii of Institutes, the "contradictions" issue is dealt with immediately and succinctly: "Do real contradictions occur in Scripture? Or are there any inexplicable (alyta) passages which cannot be explained and made to harmonize? We deny."

Turretin himself explains why there are no real and true contradictions thus:

The above stands in contrast to Isaac Ong's claims that "Turretin dispels the argument made by those who hold to VPP that if the text is not perfectly preserved, then the whole Bible is corrupt" and "Turretin is not concerned about the small variations in the texts; these do not hinder the truth and discredit the doctrine of God's providential preservation of His Word".  (Life BPC, putting together Turretin's words from different pages of Institutes, attempts to show that a corrupted Bible can still be the judge of controversies and things pertaining to faith and practice as "they [i.e. the errors or variations] are not universal in all the manuscripts; or they are not such as cannot be easily corrected from a collation of the Scriptures and the various manuscripts" (p. 9, Preserving Our Godly Path).

Jeffrey Khoo emphasizes that when Turretin (and for that matter, the reformers) spoke of the "original texts" which are "pure and uncorrupted", he [Turretin] was not referring to the non-existent "autographs" but the "apographs" (ie, copies) which "set forth to us the Word of God in the very words of those who wrote under the inspiration of the Holy Spirit" as he [Turretin] could not have affirmed this if God had/has not preserved entirely and fully His inspired words to the last jot and tittle (VPP).  Khoo notes that Isaac Ong, after quoting Turretin on the "original texts", also quoted Turretin's view that a Bible version can be considered "perfect" but only in "another" sense – i.e., in the derived sense, and hence it is not wrong to say that the KJV is "perfect" in the derived sense insofar as it accurately translates the original:  Khoo refers readers to p. 8 of his   Questions and Answers on the KJV while Ong (quoting Turrentin's Institutes) refers to "perfection of the version itself" if it follows faithfully the original text.  Ong, however, seems to think of "original text" as  the non-existent autographa and not the extant apographa (see "John Owen's view on preservation" above on Ong's view).

Milne in Has the Bible been kept pure? at pp. 203–204 points to Turretin viewing the autographa as not corrupted in the extant apographa as seen in the Formula Consensus Helvetica prepared in 1675 in Zurich by John Henry Heidegger of Zurich, with the help of Turretin of Geneva and Lucas Gernler of Basel, affirming the providential preservation of Scripture thus:

Dean Burgon and Higher Criticism 
Both Jeffrey Khoo and Isaac Ong commended John William Burgon, known as Dean Burgon, for taking a strong stand against the false or inferior textual critical methods of Westcott and Hort.   Isaac Ong says Burgon had indicated that the TR needed revision and that any revision of the Textus Receptus must be done using the principles of Higher Criticism.  But Jeffrey Khoo says Ong must be mistaken as Burgon did not advocate "Higher Criticism".

Higher or source criticism is a branch of biblical studies that emerged in mostly German academic circles in the late eighteenth century that seeks to investigate the origins of a text by focusing on its sources to determine who wrote it, when and where it was written without treating the Bible as the inerrant Word of God but as a text created by human beings at a particular historical time and for various human motives to be analysed, interpreted and evaluated like any other book; in contrast, lower (or textual) criticism seeks to determine the original form of a text from variants.

Burgon had himself said that the Textus Receptus "is an incomparably better text than that which either Lachmann, or Tischendorf, or Tregelles has produced: infinitely preferable to the New Greek Text of the Revisionists [i.e. Westcott and Hort]" and "[t]hat to be improved, it will have to be revised on entirely different principles from those which are just now in fashion" and "[m]en must begin by unlearning the German prejudices of the last fifty years; and address themselves, instead, to the stern logic of facts".  Burgon on pp. 134–135 of Revision Revised (1883) heaped "shame on that two-thirds majority of well-intentioned but most incompetent men" who, appointed to correct "plain and clear errors" in the English "Authorized Version", occupied themselves instead with "'falsifying the inspired Greek Text' in countless places"; he added on p. 231 that "Prebendary Scrivener, the only competent textual critic among the whole party, was perpetually outvoted by two-thirds of those present."

Isaac Ong seems to be flirting with Higher Criticism as he himself recognises that "Higher Criticism and German rationalism … are the roots of liberal theology".  Norman Geisler warns that a person may fall prey to Higher Criticism's subtle influences no matter how evangelical [fundamentalist] his background or training.  Herman C. Hanko notes that this has already happened with men claiming to believe that the Bible is the Word of God adopting higher critical methods in the explanation of the Scriptures so that it is almost impossible to find an evangelical professor in  theological schools who still holds uncompromisingly to the doctrine of the infallible inspiration of the Scriptures, and the insidious danger is that higher criticism is promoted by those who claim to believe in infallible inspiration.Gary North says that there is little doubt that Darwinism [evolutionism] and higher criticism were the two sources in the successful assault on Christianity in the late-nineteenth century.  (See also "B B Warfield and Inerrancy" above.)

William B. Riley in his book "The Finality of Higher Criticism or The Theory of Evolution and False Theology" (1909) points to a booklet entitled "Higher Criticism" by R S Driver and A F Kirkpatrick, respectively Regius Professors of Hebrew at Oxford and Cambridge Universities, saying that the text of Scripture "is seriously corrupt" when the text of the Old Testament more than 2,000 years ago "was in every essential respect what it is at this hour" and Moses, Joshua and Samuel – despite the Scriptures saying so – are not the authors of the Pentateuch and the books of Joshua and Samuel; Riley points to Frederic Bettex, a German scholar, in his book "The Bible – the Word of God" (p. 276) summing up the views of the "Progressives" or higher critics (in his country) thus: "Revelation? No. Inspiration of the Bible? No. Trinity? No. Fall? No. Devil, angels? No. Miracles? No. Decalogue from Sinai? No. Wrath of God? No. Prophecy? No. Christ God? No. Reconciliatory death of Jesus? No. Did Christ rise again? No. Resurrection of all the dead, and final judgment? No."

Bettex in his book above says that higher criticism has led (1) Christians, who instead of accepting "It is written", to ask:  "Is it written?  Where?  Who wrote it? Is the passage genuine? Who will prove it"; (2) to a void of judgment shown by the fact that many confess the Deity of Christ but in the same breath doubt the truth of the Old Testament, the Book which the God-man Christ – in opposition to the world and Satan – posits with the absolute word that it is written, the Scripture cannot be broken and one jot or one tittle shall in no wise pass from the law, and repeatedly appeals to Moses, David, and the prophets;  and (3) to almost no Christian any longer distinguishing "clearly between yea and nay, truth and falsehood, light and darkness, children of God and children of the devil, Christ and Belial".

G I Williamson and VPP 
While Isaac Ong prints only the emails from G I Williamson without the email sent to Williamson to provide the context of the inquiry, Williamson apparently responded with a second email without prompting as he seemed to think that the question posed by the inquirer, "There are some influential leaders in my Church who understand and quote your statement to support the idea that God has raised, among the midst of the Byzantine/Majority/Received Text, a single purified Text which is the virtual 'photocopy' of the autograph", could be skewed or loaded and felt he needed to explain his first email.  Jeffrey Khoo mentions that two of his former students in the FEBC-Life BPC VPP dispute had written against him and misrepresented him that they subsequently retracted in a signed statement.

Isaac Ong directs his readers to Jeffrey Khoo's KJV: Questions and Answers, p. 23.   The question there is: What does the Westminster Confession of Faith mean by the words "kept pure in all ages"?  The first part of Khoo's answer quotes Prof William F Orr of Pittsburgh Theological Seminary affirming "that the Hebrew text of the Old Testament and the Greek of the New which was known to the Westminster divines was immediately inspired by God because it was identical with the first text that God had kept pure in all the ages" and "[t]he idea that there are mistakes in the Hebrew Masoretic texts or in the Textus Receptus of the New Testament was unknown to the authors of the Confession of Faith".  Khoo then  goes on to state that G I Williamson "did likewise write to this effect" by quoting Williamson on God's "singular care and providence" by which He has "kept pure in all ages" the original text, so that we now actually possess it in "authentical" form – just like the photographic copy of a will "would still preserve the text of that will exactly the same as the original itself" if the original had been destroyed and although photography was not invented until long after God's Word was first written and the original writing or copy had been worn or lost, the question on how then could the original text of the Word of God be preserved is answered as:  "God preserved it by His own remarkable care and providence."

Although Khoo did not say in KJV: Questions and Answers, p. 23 that Williamson takes the view that the perfect text for the Greek NT is the Textus Receptus, almost the entire last two paragraphs on p. 15 of G.I. Williamson's  book The Westminster Confession of Faith For Study Classes were quoted verbatim by Jeffrey Khoo (see above for excerpts of some of Williamson's words in quotes) since Williamson subscribes to the perfect preservation of God's Word.   Those who opposed VPP apparently emailed Williamson because they knew that he had in 1997 written an article entitled "Should We Still Use the KJV Today?" stating that the NKJV is his "version of choice for use in the pulpit and in teaching" and he would therefore probably say that the TR is not perfect, which he duly did, so that they could undermine the VPP doctrine.  The New Testament of the NKJV is translated from same Textus Receptus (TR) as the KJV but some editions of the NKJV give translations of the Majority Text in the margin where the Majority Text differs from the TR. These variant readings would make it appear that the TR is not reliable, and therefore, the Authorised Version, which used the TR in Greek for its New Testament translation, is impliedly suspect itself.  (See also "NIV, KJV and their texts" above).

Jeffrey Khoo, however, points out that Williamson "did not in any way deny that God has indeed preserved His words to the last jot and tittle, without any words lost (as seen in his excellent "photocopy" illustration) which is the doctrine of VPP" and surmises that "Williamson's half-hearted commitment to the TR may be due to his preference for the NKJV and possibly the so-called Majority Text edited by Hodges and Farstad"; Khoo also points out that the MT (with a non-fixed or evolving text) is at odds with that of the TBS which upholds the historic, orthodox Protestant position that teaches the Church is – and always has been – in possession of the true text of Scripture; and the TBS has also critiqued the NKJV.

KJV and VPP 
Although Life BPC's Preserving Our Godly Path does not cite One Bible Only? (after it had been exposed as anti-KJV) or Doug Kutilek, who wrote a chapter in the book and was cited by PG Tang in her support of Charles Seet and Life BOE (see "FEBC and Life BPC on VPP" and "Psalm 12:6-7 on preservation" above), Life BPC's ambivalence on the KJV is clear as Preserving Our Godly Path (p. 9)  cites substantially Rowland S Ward, who shares the same view as the editors/writers of One Bible Only? in endorsing modern Bible versions over the KJV and whose quote of A J Brown in his book was also followed by Life BPC (albeit slightly expanded) at footnote reference [5] on p. 13 of Preserving Our Godly Path in their attempt to support a claim on p. 6 of their paper that the TBS does not share FEBC's VPP view, labelled as "new" by Life BPC.

Paul Ferguson  in Trinitarian Bible Society, Verbal Plenary Preservation, and the Texts Underlying the Authorised Version methodically dismantles Life BPC's view that the TBS's position is in contradistinction/opposed to FEBC's VPP position – including detailing in footnote reference [1] the desperateness of Life BPC to buttress their misrepresentation of the TBS's view by resorting to citing the statements in a very old document  "Faith and Textual Scholarship" in TBS Quarterly Record (Oct–Dec 1984) made by A J Brown, a former TBS editorial secretary who had advocated the "Majority Text" position in the 80's and was dismissed by the TBS in 1991 (as reported by David Cloud at  Moving Away From Preserved Scripture: Examining The Hodges-Farstad Majority Text), even though Brown's statements were no longer valid in light of the TBS's  "Statement of Doctrine of Holy Scripture" (released in 2005) and the advice of David Larlham, the then Assistant General Secretary of TBS, who had written to Jeffrey Khoo (in or around 2005) that "neither you [Khoo] nor the Rev. Wong [of  Life BPC] should place any such reliance upon the comments of Mr Andrew Brown going back around 20 years" – before Ferguson declares in his paper that it is crystal clear to anyone, who reads with an open mind the TBS's "Statement of Doctrine of Holy Scripture", that the TBS believe in VPP in the various editions of the printed Greek Texts of the Textus Receptus and, had the TBS not been limited by "the scope of the Society's Constitution" to look into the minor variations between the printed editions of the Textus Receptus, they would probably lean more to the view of FEBC as it undoubtedly makes more sense to assume that the KJV translators made the right choices with the greater evidence before them in determining the true text when comparing the "variations" in the various printed editions of the Received Text.

Adopting a faith-based  test for determining the exact words of Holy Scripture, which is the doctrine of providential preservation that teaches that the Church is—and always has been—in possession of the true text of Scripture, the TBS's "Statement of Doctrine of the Holy Scripture" declares that "the Masoretic Hebrew and the Greek Received Texts are the texts that the Constitution of the Trinitarian Bible Society acknowledge to have been preserved by the special  providence of God within Judaism and Christianity. Therefore these texts are definitive   and the final point  of reference in all the Society's work ... [as] they reflect the qualities of God-breathed Scripture, including being authentic, holy, pure, true, infallible, trustworthy, excellent, self-authenticating, necessary, sufficient, perspicuous, self-interpreting, authoritative and inerrant (Psalm 19:7–9, Psalm 119) ... and are consequently to be received as the Word of God (Ezra 7:14; Nehemiah 8:8; Daniel 9:2; 2 Peter 1:19) and the correct reading at any point is to be sought within these texts". The TBS uses for the purposes of translation [of the New Testament] the text reconstructed by F.H.A. Scrivener published (posthumously) in 1894.

Isaac Ong did not seem to agree with LBPC in their interpretation of Matthew 5:18 in Preserving Our Godly Path as not referring to the preservation of God's Word – see "Isaac Ong joins in" above on his agreeing with Carol Lee on the preservation verses.  However, Ong's article was likely published in the latter half of 2005 (or early 2006), after Life BPC had apparently changed its position with the release at the church's ACM in April 2004 of Our Statement of Faith on the Preservation of God's Word in which the two then Assistant Pastors, Charles Seet and Colin Wong, and the four non-VPP elders aligned with them claimed that "contrary to unfounded allegations and baseless claims", they "hold to an INERRANT and INFALLIBLE Bible and the FULL preservation of God's holy Word" (capitalised by them) as "God has fully preserved His Word in the body of manuscripts (or texts or copies) after the original autographs were lost", – which is VPP, since verbal means "words" and plenary means "full".

With the "body of manuscripts" no longer identified as the Byzantine/Majority/Received family of texts in Our Statement of Faith on the Preservation of God's Word, the belief of Seet and Wong and the four non-VPP elders seems to be the same as Isaac Ong's "providential preservation of the Word of God in the totality of the manuscripts" – which in turn is similar to Roland Ward's "all manuscript evidence" view of God's providence extending to all events including preserving the manuscripts in the Critical Text used for translating modern Bible versions  and the same as that in One Bible Only? that "God has providentially preserved His Word in and through all of the extant manuscripts, versions, and other copies of Scripture" (p. 121) – see "FEBC and Life BPC on VPP" above.

Still labelling VPP as a theory in his paper even though he seems not to agree with Life BPC in Preserving Our Godly Path and Roland Ward in interpreting Matthew 5:18 as not referring to the "jot-and-tittle" preservation of God's Word, Ong concluded his article with a call to all Calvarians to earnestly pray for and affirm the use of the KJV in their church without having to make VPP a matter of contention, to unite to defend the Word of God against its real foes represented by the modern day Bible perversions, and to "stand fast in one spirit, with one mind striving together [and not striving against one another] for the faith of the gospel" (Philippians 1:27).

Jeffrey Khoo, quoting the same verse   (KJV) but without the words added by Isaac Ong within the parentheses, says Ong should be siding with FEBC and TBS rather than with Williamson and the NKJV, and he [Ong] should also reject Spurgeon's endorsement of the Revised Version ("RV") of Westcott and Hort (notwithstanding Spurgeon's renown as the "Prince of Preachers" and Ong's noting Spurgeon's non-hesitation in using other versions and older manuscripts even though he [Spurgeon] generally preached from the KJV).

 Joshua Lim Heong Wee and Philip Tang KH join in 
Joshua Lim Heong Wee and Philip Tang KH, in their rejoinder Kicking Against The Pricks to Jeffrey Khoo's Kicking Against The Pricks: the SCCC contradicts the ICCC on VPP, claim that Khoo is “confused” in saying that the Hebrew/Aramaic words of the Masoretic Text and the Greek words of the Textus Receptus are the very inspired and preserved words of God.

They were refuted in their claim by Paul Ferguson who found their article VPP: Kicking Against the Pricks published in the Far Eastern Beacon by the Singapore Council of Christian Churches (“SCCC”), the national affiliate of the ICCC in Singapore, to be “a strange kind of defence [in the SCCC saying it is consistent with the ICCC]” as even at first glance the defence is “riddled with inaccuracies, incoherent inconsistencies and absurd definitions” and contradicts and undermines the original resolution in 1998 of the ICCC by describing it as “ignorant” of the CUV's use to save millions of Chinese Christians through famous evangelists like Wang Ming Dao and John Sung Shang Chieh while not telling the article's readers whether they [Joshua Lim and Philip Tang] believe God has preserved more of His Words in the text underlying the CUV or the KJV (which is the critical issue here) and in so doing, they seem to imply that “the ICCC was an extreme King James Version Only (KJVO) organisation”.

Paul Ferguson in footnote reference 2 of The Resolutions of the ICCC and SCCC on Bible Versions remarks that Joshua Lim had decried his own ability to give theological and doctrinal analyses in an earlier article Lim had styled   An Open Letter to the redeemed of the Lamb of God, even our Saviour Jesus Christ and protested therein, “I am no theologian and I do not wish to delve with the VPP issue” while Philip Tang “in his own limited description in the Beacon article does not appear to be any more qualified to speak definitively on theology as his sole qualifications are that he has been a member of the Bible-Presbyterian Church since 1971”. Joshua Lim had in his open letter remarked or asked “Can anyone say he or she has never lied or distorted the truth or uttered untruth?” and “I am no theologian and I do not wish to delve with the VPP issue.”

 Philip Heng Swee Choon joins in 
Philip Heng Swee Choon, Advisory Pastor of Galilee BPC, takes a different view on inspiration as he claimed to have not heard that "the Bible was inspired in any version or translation or manuscripts other than the original manuscripts". Even though Life BPC declares in What We Believe on its website on “the KJV Bible to be nothing less than God's powerful inspired Word, just as any faithful translation of God's Word into any language can also be presented as being His inspired word” and on the apostle Paul in 2 Timothy 3:15-17 calling the Scriptures that Timothy had as “inspired” despite the fact that he had only a copy (either the Old Testament in Hebrew or a Greek translation of the Old Testament), Life BPC seems happy to ignore Heng's confusion or ignorance and put up his article dated 26 April 2008 misrepresenting that VPP is perfect KJV, and the KJV is "100% perfect, equivalent or the replica of the original Word of God" – not unlike Michael D Sproul in the U.S who, seemingly misinformed, claimed without basis that Jeffrey Khoo (like Ruckman) “believes that God inspired the [KJV] translators to create a new edition of the TR by the Word choices in English”,  the translators are “perfect” so that “no one can ever touch the TR of the King James translators’ creation” and, above all, spread the serious falsehood that the young Turks in the VPP leaders over whom Waite “has had tremendous influence” [Jeffrey Khoo and SY Quek] had forced out the senior leader and founder of the BP movement to the rejoicing of Satan and the quenching of the Holy Spirit.

Philip Heng was in the U.S. for theological studies in 1958–1963 and 1983–85. Despite this, it appears from his statements that he was unaware that John Calvin (1509–1564) takes the view that the Scripture that he [Calvin] possessed “is the same one which has ‘flowed to us from the very mouth of God’” (Calvin: Institutes of the Christian Religion, 2 vols., ed. John T McNeill (Philadelphia: The Westminster Press, 1960, I. vii.5)) and Calvin, in his commentary on II Timothy, also points to having the inspired inerrant Word of God kept intact in the Scriptures (which is the Old Testament that Paul speaks of in ).

Milne in Has the Bible been kept pure?, p. 190  says Westminster divine Anthony Burgess in his An Expository Comment Doctrinal, Controversial, and Practical upon the first chapter of the second epistle of Paul to the Corinthians (London: printed by A.M. for Abel Roper, 1661) refers to 2 Timothy 3:16 in which ‘all Scripture’ denotes in the first instance the Old Testament, and Milne remarks that despite the fact that the copies of the OT that Timothy had were written centuries ago Paul still writes that all Scripture Timothy possessed was inspired by God.

Heng claims that he was taught that the inspiration of the Bible was in the original languages of Greek and Hebrew and he understood from the BP Church's constitution that this refers to only the original manuscripts or the Autographs.  But Article 4.2.1 is precise in that the inspired Scriptures the B-P Church believes to be infallible and inerrant are the Scriptures in the original languages and not simply and only the autographs.  The words of Article 4.2.1 are: “We believe in the divine, verbal and plenary inspiration of the Scriptures in the original languages, their consequent inerrancy and infallibility, and, as the Word of God, the Supreme and final authority in faith and life” (italics added to the words “original languages”).

Generations of Reformed, including John Owen and Francis Turretin, “held to the preservation of the God-breathed text, the inspired text in the copies and not merely in the autographa”, mirroring the views of the Westminster divines contemporaneous with or before them, and Richard Muller sums up the position of the 17th century Protestant orthodox in Dictionary of Latin and Greek Theological Terms (Grand Rapids: Baker, 1985), 53-54 thus:

Unlike Timothy Tow, who was named in the obituary of Allan MacRae as among the scholars of calibre trained under MacRae and who had written many theological books in Tow's own name, Heng (who does not seem to have authored any book) is not known for the depth of theological knowledge but for his belief and practice of “exorcism”.  The FEBC board disapproved of Heng's practice of casting out demons and he resigned from the FEBC on 7 March 1989; the Session (except for a deacon) of Galilee BPC, Heng's own church, also did not agree with him on his practice of “exorcism” and two other issues but the congregation voted to retain him as pastor by a two-to-one vote.

Heng claims to have written his article Regarding the Inspiration of the Bible on his own accord as he says he feels duty‐bound to write the truth as he knows it and claims that he loves and respects brethren on both sides of the issue.  Apparently aware that Timothy Tow had written to Life BPC on 4 January 2008 to plead with it to live peaceably with FEBC by respecting the College's right to use the church sanctuary and to heed God's command against removing ancient landmarks (Proverbs 22:28), Heng turned this verse on Biblical land law on its head by applying it to caution FEBC to “[r]emove not the ancient landmark, which thy fathers have set” in respect of the doctrine of the church. But Timothy Tow was the founding pastor who had set the doctrinal landmark of the Singapore BPC as her first (and only) theologian at her founding.  He was still around to defend the VPP doctrine in April 2008 when Heng wrote his article as Timothy Tow was named as one of the defendants in the lawsuit commenced by Life BPC against the FEBC directors in September 2008 to evict them from operating the FEBC on the Gilstead Road premises teaching and preaching VPP (see “Life BPC's Lawsuit against FEBC” below).

SH Tow, another founding leader of the Singapore BPC, in the 60th anniversary magazine of the Bible-Presbyterian Movement 1950–2010 wrote: “The group of dissenters have erroneously labelled ‘VPP’ a new doctrine and ‘heresy’ … [with] no factual support.  On the contrary, the doctrine of divine textual preservation has been the stand and contention of the original B-P founding pastor Timothy Tow all along, for how could ‘VPI’ [also a new acronym] stand without the undergirding support of ‘VPP’?  Surely the ‘Inspired’ words could not have survived the ravages of time but for the divine Hand of God perfectly preserving each and every word of the source texts of both the OT and NT”; and he [SH Tow] then went on to remark, “The dissenters are in serious error to label the doctrine of ‘VPP’ as new, just because they became aware of it only about the year 2002.  But my book Beyond Versions (1998) had mentioned the divinely ‘preserved’ text in six places, only without the initials ‘VPP’.  For example, on page 109, I had written of the KJB in these words: ‘It is … the authoritative and accurate translation into English of the plenarily and verbally inspired, inerrant, preserved Hebrew and Greek Words of God’.”

Heng, like Joshua Lim, was a witness for Life BPC in its unsuccessful lawsuit to evict the FEBC from the Gilstead Road premises.  (See also “Life BPC's Lawsuit against FEBC” below.)  Heng, who had served as Assistant Pastor to Timothy Tow at Life BPC from 1963–1970, was said by Joshua Lim on p. 186 of Heritage & Legacy (2018) to have in particular his relationship with Timothy Tow stretched to breaking point as he [Heng] had accepted an invitation in 1969 to speak at a Methodist church against the BPC's stance of separation (from churches in the modernist ecumenical fold); and, after Tow had left for a 5-month sabbatical leave in the Holy Land in July 1969, Joshua Lim seemed to be hoping that Tow would not return to pastor Life BPC (based on talk Joshua Lim claimed to have heard) even though the plan before Tow left was to return to pastor the church and this was followed through with Heng resigning subsequently in August 1970 despite Joshua Lim saying (also in Heritage & Legacy, p. 186) that the votes of the Session of Life BPC were skewed towards Heng.

 Jack Sin joins in 
Jack Sin, currently [December 2021] pastor of Sovereign Hope BPC, joined the debate with his article entitled "A Grave Matter: Verity, Sagacity and Clarity in the Textual Debate", a copy of which is still on Life B-P Church's website. Sin was previously the pastor of Maranatha BPC and the first Dean of students of ERBC before he left in January 2018 – a year after ERBC's inauguration in January 2017.   Sin's undated article was written in or after 2007 as it made reference on p. 1 to the 2007 Membership Handbook of Maranatha BPC.

Sin commences his article by stating on p. 1 that “[a]n objective and biblical appraisal” of the VPP debate is required.  However, Biak Lawm Thang, in "A Review of Jack Sin's Article, 'A Grave Matter: Verity, Sagacity and Clarity in the Textual Debate'" in the July 2008 issue of The Burning Bush, concludes that “[n]either was [Sin] fair in his quotation of the works of others nor unbiased in his presentation of the opposing view” and "[h]is appraisal which is destitute of biblical proof, citing only human authorities with partial quotations, cannot be considered 'biblical' or 'objective' or 'honest'”.

Sin states on p. 4 of his article that "the frequent quoting of the scripture verses like Psalm 12:6–7; Matthew 5:18; 24:35; Psalm 19:7; 1 Corinthians 13:8, Isaiah 40:8 and Psalm 119:89 [by FEBC] do not support the VPP teaching of a perfect TR of 1611." But these verses were not used by FEBC, where Sin had served as a faculty member until 2007, or VPP proponents to identify the TR of 1611 but only used as a prelude or a foundational argument against VPP opponents who do not believe that God's words have been fully preserved.

While Sin decried that the verses quoted by VPP proponents do not support a perfect TR of 1611, Sin himself (on page 3 of his article) uses two of the verses – Isaiah 40:8 and Psalm 119:89 – to support his belief that God's words are fully preserved "in the body of the Byzantine or Traditional complete family of texts (as opposed to the inferior Alexandrian text type)" even though these two verses also do not identify the "Byzantine or Traditional complete family of texts".

Sin says “the TR underlying the KJV is a subset … of the Byzantine family type text” and “the very words of God in scripture are preserved perpetually altogether but NOT necessarily only in the TR that undergird [sic] the KJV” as “[i]t [sic] is [sic] found in all the providentially preserved Majority or Traditional or Byzantine Greek manuscripts of over 5,000 …”  However, a set must contain all the elements of its subset, which means that the TR underlying the KJV can only be a subset of the larger Majority or Traditional or Byzantine Greek manuscripts set if all the words of the TR are in this larger set.  The Majority Text does not have all the words of the TR.  While the TR is a form of the majority text in that the TR does represent the majority of textual witnesses in most readings, it is not entirely a “majority text” and there are other essential factors beyond merely examining the extant manuscripts in determining the true reading of Scripture: the Johannine Comma in 1 John 5:7, “For there are three that bear record in heaven, the Father, the Word, and the Holy Ghost: and these three are one (with the Comma in italics), is a well-known example in that while there is manuscript evidence for this TR reading, the majority of existing manuscripts do not support the inclusion of this reference to the Triune Godhead; the Hodges-Farstad majority text, which has almost 1900 differences with the TR, does not have the Johannine Comma.  And David Cloud says, “But now we have Peter Ruckman on one side with his strange spirit and odd, twisted ideas [of the English KJV being more inspired than the underlying Greek NT text or words] and on the other side those who want to correct the God-honored and preserved Textus Receptus by the so-called Majority text.  Only the devil sows confusion, though he often is able to use even saved men for his evil deeds as he did Peter that sad day.”  One Bible Only? on p. 85, quoting current leading textual critic Dan Wallace on p. 83, indicates that there are 1,838 differences between the Textus Receptus and the Majority Text; and the chart on p. 85 lists in columnar form some differences, including the TR having the Trinitarian formula of 1 John 5:7-8 while the MT does not.

Biak notes Sin saying that he believes the Byzantine family of manuscripts, not the Alexandrian family, preserves the words of God, but when it comes to the Greek printed texts that represent those over 5,000 manuscripts, Sin's commitment to "honesty" made him uncertain or unable to know or identify the inspired and preserved words in the various editions of the TR and, at this point, he disagrees with Edward F Hills, whom Sin appears to follow as he quotes Hills frequently as an authority, who had no problem identifying the Greek Text of the KJV to be God's approved Text, and a portion of Hills's words – which Sin failed to quote despite claiming a quest for "honesty" in biblical scholarship – reads:

Biak also writes that it is a fact, admitted by VPPists, that there exists variant readings in the Greek manuscripts that number over 5,000 and that even in the TR editions there are a few minor differences but despite this, Hills (and others as well) does recognise the existence of those variants and the difficulty in making textual decisions in certain cases but yet does not stop there, for a specific identification of the text is necessary if every word of God is to be authoritative, and he did identify the KJV Greek Text to be the God-approved Text per his words quoted above.  For practical purposes, others like the Trinitarian Bible Society, which has been quoted by Sin as another authority, also uses the KJV Greek Text as edited by Scrivener.  (See also “KJV and VPP” under “Isaac Ong joins in” above.)

The TR underlying the KJV is the best and purest for it perfectly preserves all the words of God originally given by divine inspiration so that holding the TR of the KJV in their hands, VPPists can say without apology, "This is the very Word of God": the issue or debate is not about translations, but the Bible in the original languages.  Holding such a position means that there is no need for the Bible scholar to practise textual criticism as the Bible scholar can confidently use and devote his time to the sincere exposition of the truth of God's words, not doubting the text at all; Hills is thus an "honest" textual scholar, for though he recognises the difficulty in the textual issue, he calls on Christians to be guided by "the logic of faith" to identify specifically the Greek Text of the KJV to be the God-approved Text in the light of God's special providence, with Biak seeing "honesty" in the textual debate as not failing to mention Hills's precise identification of the providentially preserved and authentic Text to be the Greek Text of the KJV.

Sin says on p. 2 of his article, "In some places the Authorised Version corresponds but loosely with any form of the Greek original, while it follows exactly the Latin Vulgate".  Scrivener himself in the footnote on p. 656 of The New Testament in Greek according to the Text Followed in the Authorised Version had indicated, "The text of Beza 1598 has been left unchanged when the variation from it [Beza 1598] made in the Authorised Version is not countenanced by any earlier edition of the Greek" so that the integrity of the original Greek words in the TR has been preserved by him [Scrivener] not back-translating from the Latin Vulgate in the few places where the KJV seems to follow closely the Vulgate. Sin also says on p. 5 of his article, "No translation of one language to another will ever be perfect, regardless how learned the translators were or how superior the underlying texts or techniques may be ..." And VPPists do not take a different view that a translation, including the KJV, can be perfect. The original language Scripture (apographs or apographapograph, an exact copy ), from which the 1611 KJV was translated, is regarded by VPPists as the perfect platinum yardstick of the Smithsonian Institution, inerrant, infallible, authoritative while the KJV and other accurate and reliable translations are like the common yardstick as good and safe enough for use.

The KJV translators used mainly Beza’s 1598 edition but they also consulted the editions of Erasmus and Stephanus and the Complutensian Polygot.   However, they did not publish the Greek text from which they worked to show the Greek words they had used to translate the KJV.  F. H. A Scrivener (1813–1891) reconstructed such a text after examining eighteen editions of the TR to produce an edition of the Greek New Testament which more closely underlies the text of the AV than any one edition of the TR.  This edition, published posthumously in 1894, is currently printed by the TBS and has approximately 190 differences compared with Beza 1598 and 283 differences compared with Stephanus 1550 but these differences are minor and pale into insignificance when compared with the approximately 6,000 differences – many of which are quite substantial – between the Critical Text and the Textus Receptus.

Scrivener’s The New Testament In The Original Greek Together With The Variations Adopted In The Revised Version (Cambridge: The University Press) issued in 1881 has a 9-page appendix  at pp. 648-656 with a list of items in the Beza 1598 text that Scrivener had changed to match the readings of the King James Version on the authority of certain earlier Greek editions, and a second list of readings different from the KJV readings which were not changed as Scrivener could not find any earlier Greek text to countenance the variations in this list. Steve Combs says the first corrected list covers variances in 166 verses and 13 New Testament book titles while the second uncorrected list covers 58 variances. While Steve Combs feels that the Scrivener TR should be amended to include “Amen” at the end of Ephesians 6:24, Bearing Precious Seed Global (“BPSG”) – where Combs is their Assistant Director/Global Translation Advisor – believe that God’s preserved Greek text is the Received Text as represented in Scrivener’s 1881 text, printed posthumously in 1894 and now published by the TBS which is used by BPSG as the Greek text for their translation work.

 Puritans, Reformers and Westminster Divines 
Milne in Has the Bible been kept pure?, 164 says that  Johannes Buxtorf  Sr. (1564–1629), in his work, Tiberias, sive Commentarius Masorethicus, uses early Church Father Justin Martyr (100-165 A.D.) to reinforce the truth that the singular providence of God kept the Hebrew Bible ‘uncorrupt’ (Tiberias, 7) as “the Masoretes were diligent in their work in preserving Scripture to prevent not only any word but even so much as the least tittle being impaired or lost” alluding to Matthew 5:18; and the Westminster authorities, as with Buxtorf, viewed the intention of providence as not to present a preserved Scripture to the church at the end of the nineteenth or twentieth centuries, but to make the same Scriptures available ‘in all ages’ and this concept that God preserved the Scriptures in their original purity runs counter to the prevailing orthodoxy that the definitive text of Scripture is yet to be delineated – which is also a concept that B B Warfield adopted or reinterpreted when he made room for the conclusions of textual critics like Westcott and Hort.

Milne in Has the Bible been kept pure? also writes that Presbyterian William Jenkyn (1613–1685), who succeeded the distinguished Westminster divine William Gouge (1575–1653) at West Friars London, believed with Augustine (354-430 AD) and William Whitaker (1548–1595) that the “inspired words had been preserved and could be identified [bold added] and that if they could not, they could have no assurance that they have the Word of God at all”.  After quoting Whitaker – Professor of Divinity at Cambridge from 1575–1595 and regarded by Wayne Spear as the most significant influence on Chapter One of the WCF (The Westminster Confession of Faith and Holy Scripture, Carson and Hall (eds.), To Glorify and Enjoy God, Edinburgh: Banner of Truth (1994), 88) – in Disputation on Holy Scripture (Cambridge: The University Press (1849), 328), Milne goes on to write that “the canon of Scriptures was confirmed and received individually throughout the centuries ever since God had dictated those Scriptures for the church” and this means “the common or received Greek text of the New Testament and the Masoretic text of the Old” [bold added] which Whitaker sees as “the authentic texts of Scripture” and such a view precludes the possibility of discovering any ancient codex in the future that would recalibrate the Word of God with a fundamentally different text than the one “endorsed by the Holy Spirit in the multitude of believers”.

Milne in Has the Bible been kept pure? 104 & 107-108, quoting Westminster divine Joseph Caryl (1602–1673) on Matthew 5:18 in An Exposition with practicall observations continued upon the Thirty-fifth….Thirty-seventh Chapters of the Book of Job (London: M. Simmons (1664), 525) and Caryl’s fellow divine William Twisse (1577/8-1646) in The Scriptures Sufficiency To Determine All Matters of Faith, Made Good against the Papist: OR, That a Christian May be Infallibly Certain of His Faith and Religion by the Holy Scriptures (London: Matthew Keynton (1656)), makes the point that the words of God delivered still exist in the extant text which contains no contradictions (see also “Francis Turretin on real contradictions” above) and “[w]hen the Westminster Assembly came to compose the Chapter on Scripture in the Confession of Faith, the perfect and holy doctrines, matter and words of Scripture, were deemed to be preserved in the pure extant original language texts of Hebrew and Greek” – the purity in view being perfect or total as it is God who kept the original language texts of Scripture pure by His ‘singular care and providence’, and while His overruling providence does not imply that the autographic originals were to be produced perfectly in every copy down through the ages, “the stress of God’s ‘singular care’ emphasises the personal nature of God’s intentions to preserve the original language texts for the use of His church in all ages”; and a special providence, not a general providence, is in view.

Milne additionally in Has the Bible been kept pure?, 124 after quoting Westminster divine William Strong (d. 1654) in his A Treatise Shewing the Subordination of the Will of Man unto the Will of God (London: Francis Tyton (1657), 69) and fellow divine Edward Reynolds (1599–1676) in The First Sermon upon Hosea (London: Thomas Newcomb for Robert Bostock (1649), 132-133), writes that there is no hint in the thinking or preaching of the Westminster divines that “the Bible was imperfect and required further work by Bible critics, even reaching several hundred years into the future”.

After examining the words and works of many Westminster divines and puritans before, contemporaneous with, and after the divines, Milne in “Chapter 7: A Biblical Summary of the Reformed Epistemology” (Has the Bible been kept pure?, 291-305) writes on p. 297 that God’s character requires that He keeps to His promise to preserve His word down to the very small marks of the letters, the jots and tittles of it (Matthew 5:18) for all ages of the Church; and on pp. 299-300 Milne says that “it is true that God has not promised to maintain a single codex of both Testaments down through the ages, but as the believing church has always taught, God’s Word is locatable''' [bold added] in the Masoretic text of the Old Testament and the Greek common or majority text of the New” and “[t]hese texts have not been hidden”, and, “[w]here there are variants in the manuscripts, the church has not found it an onerous task to collate the texts and arrive at the authentic autographic text” because “the Holy Spirit has confirmed the divine authority of this Word in the hearts of His people down through the ages” while “those who are not spiritually awakened … will not recognise the divine authority of the Scriptures, nor submit to them”.

Peter Van Kleeck Jr. says “[i]t is irresponsible to assume that John Calvin, William Whitaker, the Westminster divines, and Francis Turretin were unaware of the discrepancies present in the extant textual tradition”; he [Van Kleeck] notes that Turretin in Institutes (P&R: 1992, Vol. I,111) writes that they, as well as [church fathers and  theologians] Origen (184-253 AD) and Theodoret of Cyrrhus (393-458 AD), knew of “many variant readings … in both the Old and New Testaments arising from comparison of different manuscripts”, but they “deny corruption (at least corruption that is universal)”, and the Westminster Divines and the Reformed tradition as a whole claim “God’s immediately inspired words have been kept pure in all ages” as above all those corruptions and variants stood the Scriptures which Turretin separates from the “various manuscripts” since he also writes in Institutes (P&R:1992, Vol. I, 108) of the corruptions as “not universal in all the manuscripts; or they are not such as cannot easily be corrected from a collation of Scriptures and the various manuscripts”.

Westminster divine Richard Capel stresses the importance of the Fountains (i.e., the original language copies or apographs) running clear since “if the Fountains run not clear, the translations cannot be clean”, as he (Capel) says “[i]t’s out of question that the same God, who committed the Oracles to the Jews, did also take care that they should preserve them safe and sure, uncorrupt and pure” and expects that the ‘Church of the Gentles’ similarly “have and do preserve the Greek Text uncorrupt, and clear” (Capel’s Remains (London: John Bartlet, 1658), 40, 41 & 80). Westminster divine Daniel Featley (1582–1645) says that the Bible Translated is the undoubted Word of God in as far only as it agrees with the Bible in the original languages (London: N.B. and Richard Royston (1647), Katabaptistal, Dipper dist Or, The Anabaptists Duck’d and Plung’d over head and ears, at a disputation in Southwark, 1); Featley implies that it is indeed possible to have an accurate translation or one translation may be better than another as he does indicate that the KJV is better than the Geneva Bible since the latter had many errors of translation corrected in the former. The Greek original means the Greek copies per Puritan William Fulke (1538–1589) who says, "We say indeed, that by the Greek text of the New Testament all translations of the New Testament must be tried; but we mean not by every corruption that is in any Greek copy of the New Testament."

 Life BPC's Lawsuit against FEBC 
Although Life BPC pastors and elders in Our Statement of Faith on the Preservation of God's Word claimed they "hold to an INERRANT and INFALLIBLE Bible and the FULL preservation of God's holy Word",  the Board of Elders ("BOE") declared in Mark Them Which Cause Divisions in January 2008 Life BPC's position to be non-VPP and required FEBC to give a written unconditional undertaking that the college would not promote the VPP doctrine in its night classes or it would not be allowed to use the premises from that month onwards as the BOE viewed VPP to be a heresy because it is 'new', 'infectious' and 'dangerous'.

Brutus Balan (now (i.e., November 2021) retired from pastoring Faith Baptist Church in Hobart, Tasmania) wrote a letter dated 30 January 2008 addressed to Charles Seet and the BOE of Life BPC with a plea to them to avoid carrying out their legal threat to evict FEBC from the Gilstead Road premises and remarking that Seet and the elders had the most inconsistent and contradictory position over the matter –  saying the original writings (autographs) were 'inerrant, infallible' in the past and the 'providentially preserved' copies (apographs) today have errors while claiming to hold to an 'INERRANT and INFALLIBLE BIBLE and the FULL preservation of God's holy Word' with their use of 'full' for 'not full' preservation being deceptive – but yet accused the FEBC of heresy.

FEBC rebutted Life BOE's Mark Them Which Cause Divisions with Jeffrey Khoo's response headed Making the Word of God of None Effect which argued that without a presently infallible and inerrant Word of God to the jot and tittle (Matt 5:18), the elders of Life BPC had no basis to condemn VPP as a heresy and VPP proponents as heretics.

Paul Ferguson joined in the debate with his  paper also entitled Mark Them Which Cause Divisions to criticise Life BPC for misusing the word "heresy"; maligning godly men like the three Tow brothers (Timothy, SH and Siang Yeow) as "heretics"; displaying inconsistency and muddled up thinking on the VPP issue; stating that the words of God have indeed been perfectly preserved but teaching implicitly that no one can find them all at one time and place them in one Book so that a person can read from Genesis to Revelation every perfect word of God in the originals today; endorsing the different positions of institutions (BJU and Central Baptist Theological Seminary) in their claims of superior Alexandrian texts or disavowal of preservation as a doctrine of the ancient church and the beliefs of BP ministers (Tan Eng Boo and Colin Wong) who believe that there are "better" extant Greek texts than the "best" Greek texts underlying the KJV; totally misrepresenting the VPP position as a "new" concept; misunderstanding and misapplying Spurgeon's words of "nothing new in theology save that which is false"; and showing poor scholarship and research in plagiarising the views of anti-KJV and anti-Preservation writers while ignoring the many churches and persons who are pro-KJV and VPP.

The pleas and admonitions did not stop Life BPC commencing Suit 648 in the High Court on 15 September 2008 against the directors of the FEBC, including Timothy Tow, to evict or stop them from operating the college on the Gilstead Road premises so that Life BPC could take over the operations of a Bible college with the FEBC name or with another name. Litigation was commenced even though Charles Seet himself had preached a sermon entitled "Can Christians Sue One Another?" based on 1 Cor 6:1-8 and published this as an article in the LBPC's weekly of 23 May 2004, shortly after the ACM on 25 April 2004 where the two Assistant Pastors and the non-VPP elders had presented their VPP-like Our Statement of Faith on the Preservation of God's Word'' to the congregation in their bid to oust en masse the VPP elders (who had refused to accept the resignation of Timothy Tow as Pastor) from continuing to rule the church (see "FEBC and Life BPC on VPP" above), to apparently urge those ousted to follow the example of the Lord Jesus Christ to absorb whatever grief or loss caused to them and not sue fellow Christians in secular courts.

However, Life BPC failed as the Court of Appeal held unanimously on 26 April 2011 – after examining WCF 1:8 – that:
 "the VPP doctrine is actually closely related to the VPI doctrine which both parties [i.e., the College and the Church] adhere to," (rejecting the Church's contention in [59] of the Court of Appeal Judgement that it is "an entirely different creature from the VPI doctrine)"";
 "the College, in adopting the VPP doctrine, has not deviated from the fundamental principles which guide and inform the work of the College right from its inception, and as expressed in the Westminster Confession";
 "[i]t is not inconsistent for a Christian who believes fully in the principles contained within the Westminster Confession (and the VPI doctrine) to also subscribe to the VPP doctrine"; and
 "[i]n the absence of anything in the Westminster Confession that deals with the status of the apographs, we [the Court] hesitate to find that the VPP doctrine is a deviation from the principles contained within the Westminster Confession".
(See also "Leadership of Fundamentalist Faction" above)

See also 

 Religion in Singapore

References

External links 
 Far Eastern Bible College

1955 establishments in Singapore
1988 disestablishments in Singapore
Fundamentalist denominations
Presbyterian denominations established in the 20th century
Presbyterian denominations in Asia
Presbyterianism in Singapore
Religious organizations disestablished in 1988
Christian organizations established in 1955